= Preissler =

Preissler, Preißler, or Preisler is a German surname, from G. "price, praise, praise". Notable people with the surname include:

- Sebastian Preißler (d. 1591), German glassworker
- Daniel Preissler (1627–1665), German painter
- Wolfgang Preissler (fl. 1690), Jesuit father and professor of Hebrew at the University of Prague
- Johann Daniel Preissler (1666–1737), German engraver and painter
- Ignaz Preissler (1676–1741), glass and porcelain painter
- Johann Justin Preissler (1698–1771), German painter and draughtsman
- Georg Martin Preisler (1700–1754), German engraver
- Susanna Maria Preißler (1701–1765), German gem cutter
- Barbara Helena Preissler (1707–1758), German painter
- Johann Martin Preisler (1715–1794), German engraver
- Valentin Daniel Preisler (1717–1765), German engraver
- Johann Georg Preisler (1757–1831), Danish painter
- Axel Preisler (1871-1930), Danish architect
- Jan Preisler (1872–1918), Czech painter
- Kurt Preißler (1893–1968), German painter
- Kurt Preißler (d. 1935), German painter
- Fritz Preißler (1904–1945), German politician
- Fritz Preissler (1908–1948), German-Bohemian luger
- Walter Preißler (1915–2005), German politician
- Alfred Preissler (1921–2003), German footballer and manager
- Helmut Preißler (1925–2010), German poet
- Jurgen "George" Preissler (1931–2014), German skier, miner and Carnegie Hero
- Wolfgang Preissler (1932–2023), German musician
- Horst Preisler (1935–2022), German marathon runner
- Christian Preißler (born 1942), German politician
- Edwin Preißler (1942–2008), German soccer player
- Holger Preißler (1943–2006), scholar of Islam
- Peter M. Preissler (1943–2024), Austrian director
- Rüdiger Preisler (born 1945), German sculptor
- Dietmar Preißler (born 1956), German historian
- Thomas Preissler (born 1958), German musician
- Frank Preissler (born 1959), German musician
- Juliane Preisler (born 1959), Danish writer and poet
- Uwe Preißler (born 1967), German cyclist
- Karoline Preisler (born 1971), German politician (FDP) and lawyer
- Valentin Preißler (born 1988), German jazz musician
- Moritz Preisler (born 1991), German jazz musician
- Steve Preisler , American chemist
