= Carl Marcus Tuscher =

German painter (1705–1751)

Marcus Tuscher
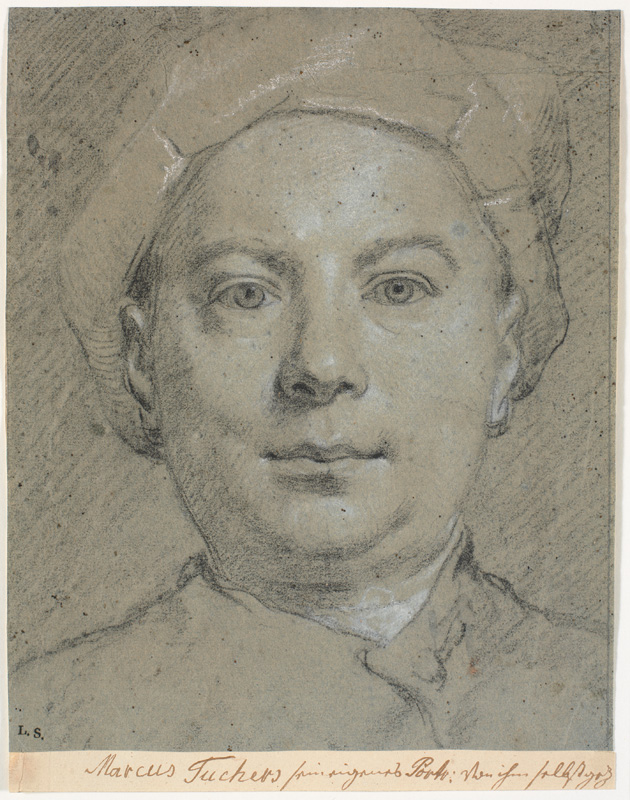
- Marcus Tuscher's self-portrait
- Born: 1 June 1705; Nuremberg, Holy Roman Empire
- Died: 6 January 1751 (aged 45); Copenhagen, Kingdom of Denmark
- Education: Johan Daniel Preisler
- Known for: Printmaking, painting, architecture

Carl Marcus Tuscher (1 June 1705 in Nuremberg – 6 January 1751 in Copenhagen) was a German-born Danish polymath: portrait painter, printmaker, architect, and decorator of the Baroque period.

== Early life and education ==
Tuscher was born in the Free Imperial City of Nuremberg in 1705 to humble parents. His mother, Ursula Negelin, was single, while his father is said to have been Ferdinand Tuscher, who gave him his name. He was educated at Findelhaus and later as an apprentice to a painter, director of Nuremberg's Academy of Arts, Johan Daniel Preisler, who was the father of engraver Johan Martin Preisler.

When his apprenticeship was over (1728), he had made considerable progress and was considered such a promising and accomplished artist that the city gave him a traveling scholarship to Rome, where in addition to studying oil painting, he studied architecture of the period, making drawings for several churches and palaces (his projects for church buildings earned him a Papal Knight's Cross). He was employed by Prussian antiquarian Baron Philipp von Stosch, whose collection contained over 10,000 cameos, intaglios, and antique glass pastes. Tuscher's pay for organizing the Baron's collection was extremely modest, but he profited greatly from his learned patron's guidance in the sciences. He also progressed significantly in his study of the classical languages during this period.

== Italy, France and England, 1734–1743 ==
Stosch, who was also a British spy, for political reason had to flee from the Papal States to Florence in 1734, taking refuge under the tolerant rule of Gian Gastone de' Medici. Tuscher followed him to live in the grand-duchy. Still employed by v. Stosch for several years, he was also given tasks by the Grand Ducal court and executed a proposal for the façade of the church of S. Lorenzo. After visiting Naples he left Italy in 1741 for France, Holland and England, even though he was aware his scholarship actually demanded that he return to Nuremberg after graduation.

In London he reunited with the Danish cartoonist and explorer, Captain Frederik Ludvig Norden, whom he had befriended in Florence. At the time, he was part of the German colony in the British capital, where he was assistant at a drawing academy, led by the goldsmith GM Moser. He painted a portrait of the family of instrument-maker Burkhardt Tschudi (1742, National Portrait Gallery (London)).

== Denmark ==
In November 1743 he moved to Copenhagen, where he was made court painter and royal architect invited by King Christian VI and had the counts Danneskiold-Samsøe as his benefactors. He got an apartment and studio at Christiansborg Palace.

In Denmark, his first work was a sumptuous decoration for Admiralty College building at the arrival of Princess Louise of Great Britain.

In 1748 he made a large plafond portrait of King Christian VI on horseback, surrounded by allegorical figures; it was destroyed when the castle burned in 1794. Many of his other works have been similarly destroyed by the ravages of time and fire. There is a portrait of King Christian VI with family (around 1744, Rosenborg) credited to Tuscher, but it is uncertain whether Tuscher himself made the work or if it was a copy made by JF Gerhard. Among his main surviving paintings are full portraits of Count Johan Ludvig Holstein and his brothers in the great hall at Ledreborg manor.

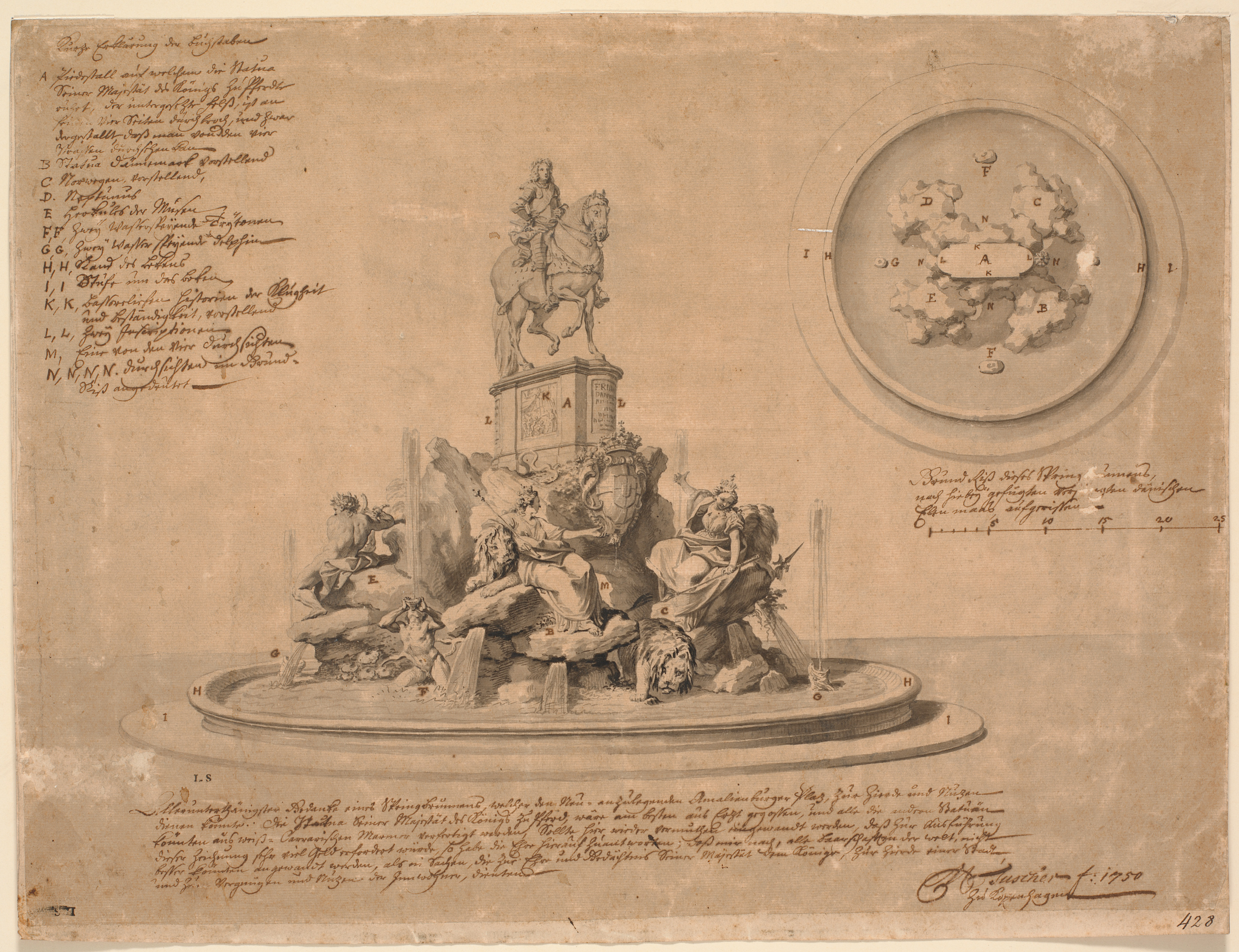
Frederik V's monumental fountain proposal

It was probably Tuscher who first proposed the idea of the octagonal square in Frederiksstaden, known today as the Amalienborg Palace Square, and he was the one who suggested a monument at the center. He drew a suggested plan (in Italian, amply illustrated), depicting a large fountain with Frederik V's statue. An equestrian statue of the King was completed in 1750 by J.-F.-J. Saly. Tuscher also made a floor plan for Amalienborg Square, which probably gave idea to Nicolai Eigtved, as it was done at the construction of the four palaces. The monument shows Tuscher's familiarity with the Italian Baroque art and a strong affinity with Bernini's fountains and sculpture sets in Rome. Stylistically, he remained faithful to the Italian baroque and was nicknamed the "Nordic Bernini".

Tuscher married Sofie Wahl (ca. 1728-6 December 1798) on 15 May 1747 in Copenhagen. She was the daughter of fellow-painter Johann Salomon Wahl and Marie Sophie Davidson. The couple had a child, Caroline Fredericia Tuscher (4 January 1751 – 15 August 1809).

Marcus Tuscher died after a long illness on 6 January 1751 under the reign of Frederik V and was buried at Vor Frelsers Kirke (Our Saviour's Church) in Copenhagen.
