= Preisler =

Preisler is a surname. Notable people with the surname include:

- Axel Preisler (1871–1930), Danish architect
- Dominik Preisler (born 1995), Czech footballer
- Georg Martin Preisler (fl. 1750), German engraver
- Jan Preisler, Czech artist
- Johan Martin Preisler, German engraver

== See also ==
- Naomi Preizler, Argentine model
