= Jonas Haas =

German-born Danish engraver (1720–1775)

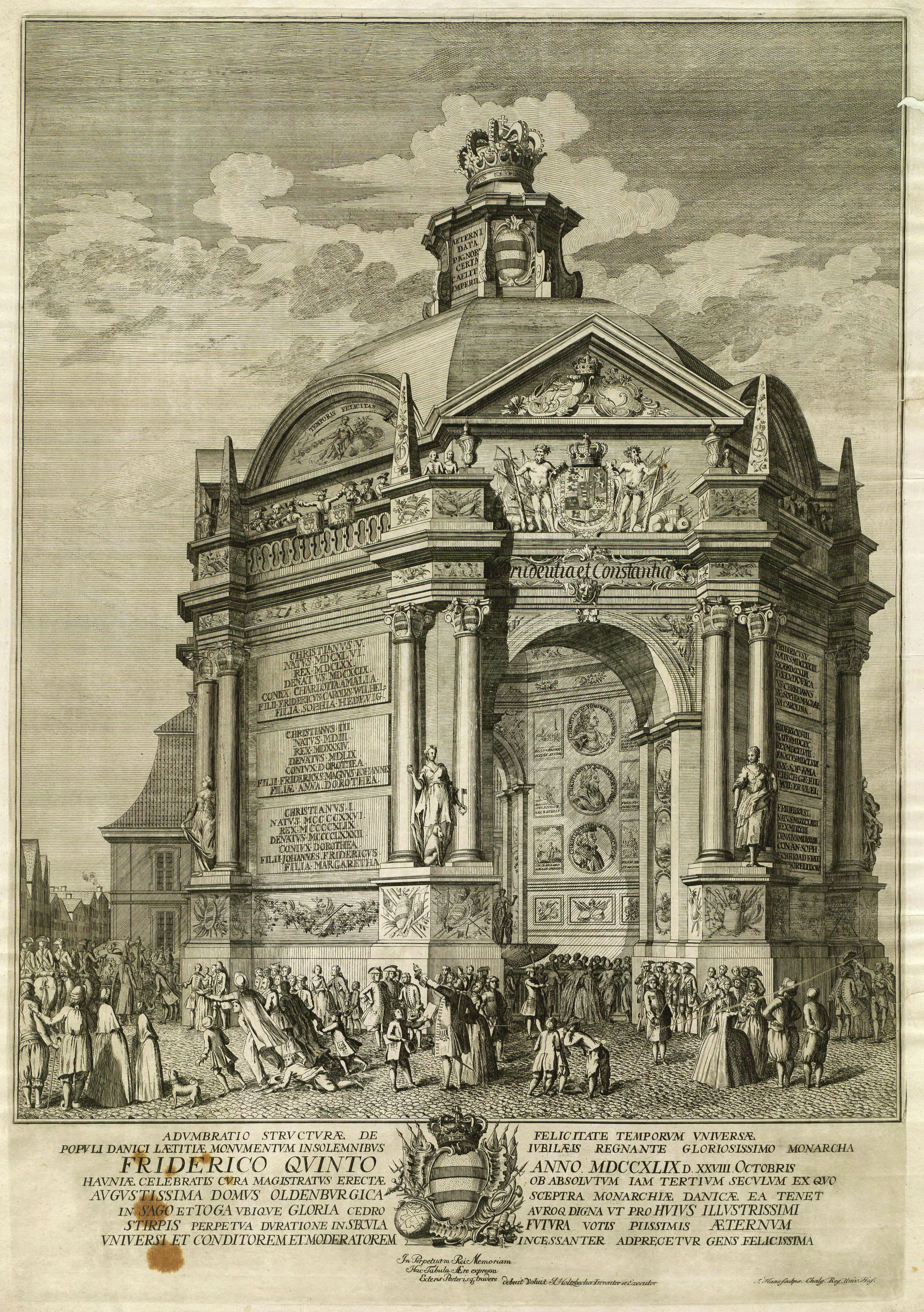
Temple of honor erected by the Copenhagen Magistrate in Gammeltorv square, to celebrate the 300 years jubilee of the ruling Oldenburg royal dynasty. Copperplate engraving by Jonas Haas, 1749

Jonas Haas (1720 – 10 April 1775) was a German-born Danish engraver.

Haas was born in Nuremberg in 1720. After spending several years working in Hamburg, he moved to Copenhagen with several other of his fellow artists. Some of these included: Johan Martin Preisler and Carl Marcus Tuscher. In 1755, Haas was appointed official engraver for the University of Copenhagen.

In addition to a large amount of small portraits of contemporary and deceased people (including 15 Zealand bishops), he produced works for The Danish Atlas and vignettes of Frederic Louis Norden's travels. In Hamburg, he had married Anna Rosine Fritsch, the daughter of an acquaintance engraver. They had four children. Three of his sons, Georg, Meno, and Peter were all engravers. Haas was buried at St. Peter's church cemetery.
