= Stephan Alexander Würdtwein =

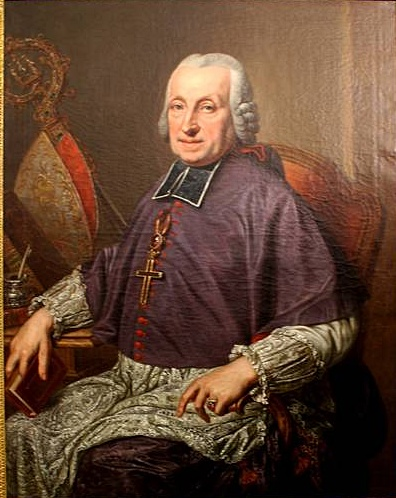
Bishop Stephan Alexander Würdtwein; painting by Johann Wilhelm Hoffnas

Stephan Alexander Würdtwein (1719 – 11 April 1796) was a German theologian, auxiliary bishop of Worms, and historian, particularly of the Catholic Church and of the history of the city of Mainz.

== Education and career ==
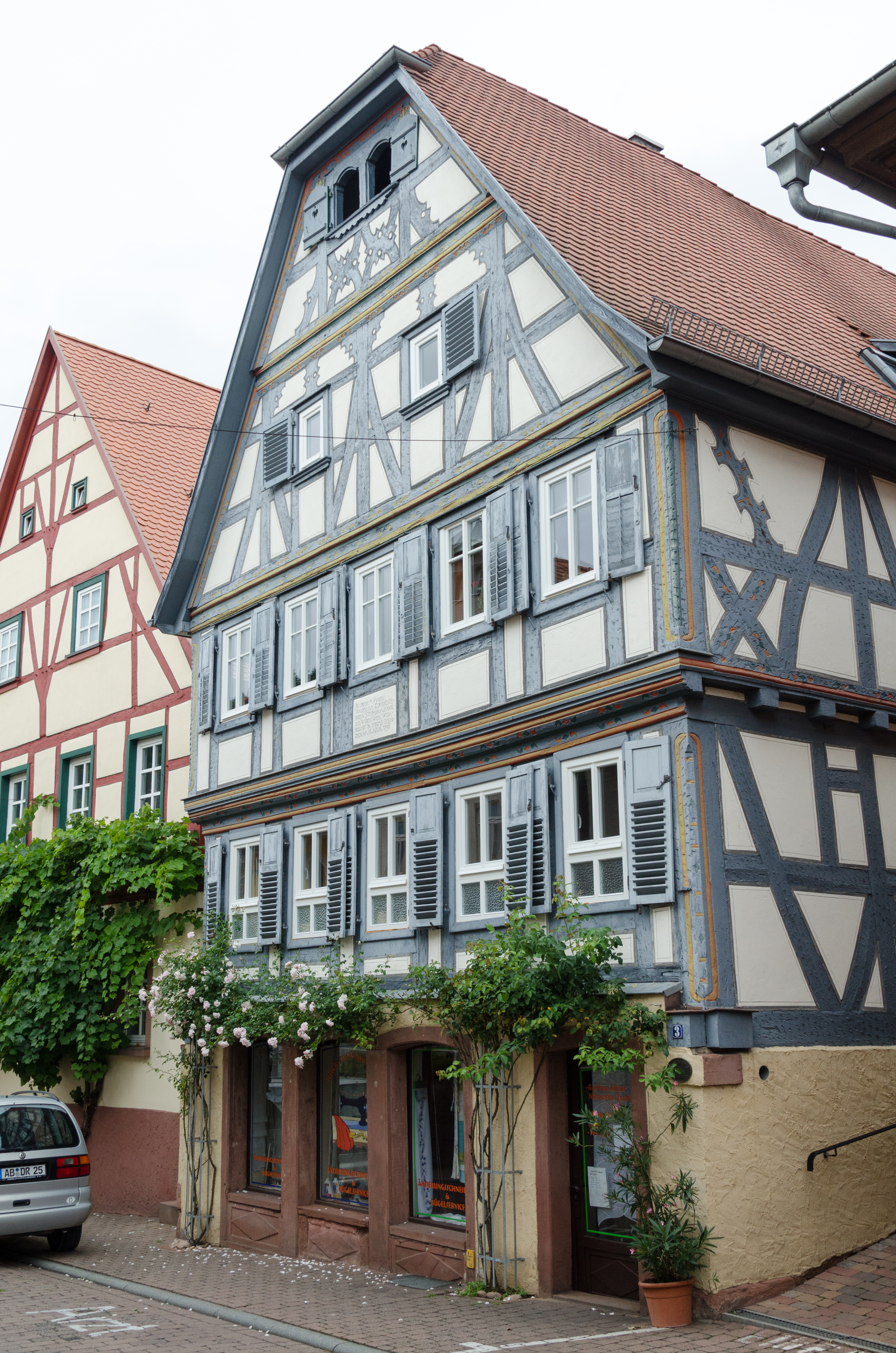
Würdtwein's birthplace in Amorbach

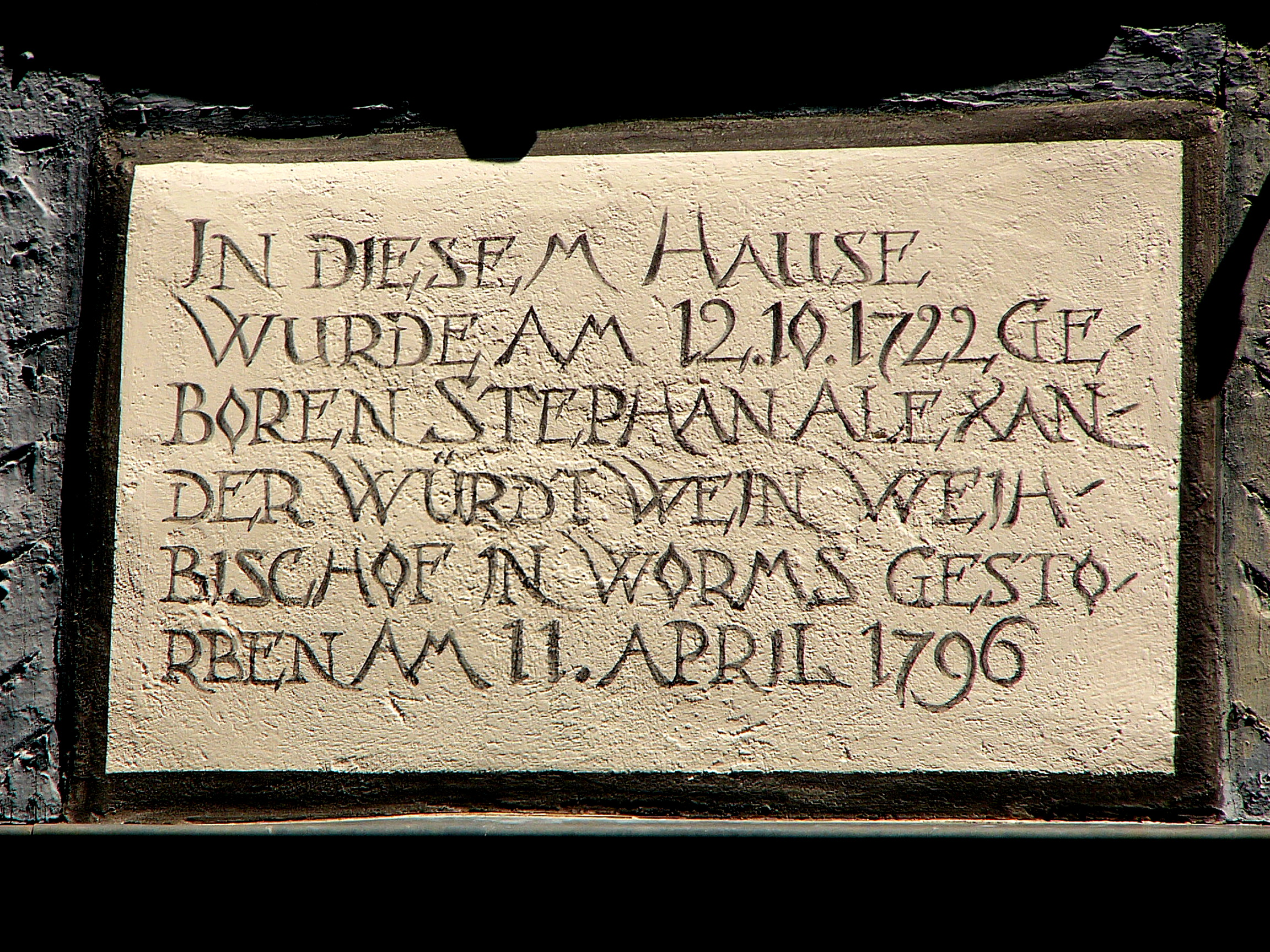
Plaque marking his birthplace

Würdtwein was born in Amorbach, the third son of Ferdinand Kasimir Würdtwein, a civil servant in the Electorate of Mainz, and his wife Magdalene (née Marklein). He attended the school of Amorbach Abbey and then the Jesuit Kronberg-Gymnasium Aschaffenburg.

He studied philosophy, theology, and canon law at the University of Heidelberg from 1738 to 1743, while living in the seminary. He attained his bachelor's and master's degrees in philosophy and studied Thomism. Next he studied canon law and dogma at the Catholic seminary in Mainz, and was ordained a priest on 18 July 1745. After serving as a chaplain in Bingen in 1746-1747, he was given a benefice in Werbach. By 1750 he had returned to Mainz, where he studied religious law at the University of Mainz until 1752.

He died in Ladenburg.

== Career in the Electorate of Mainz ==
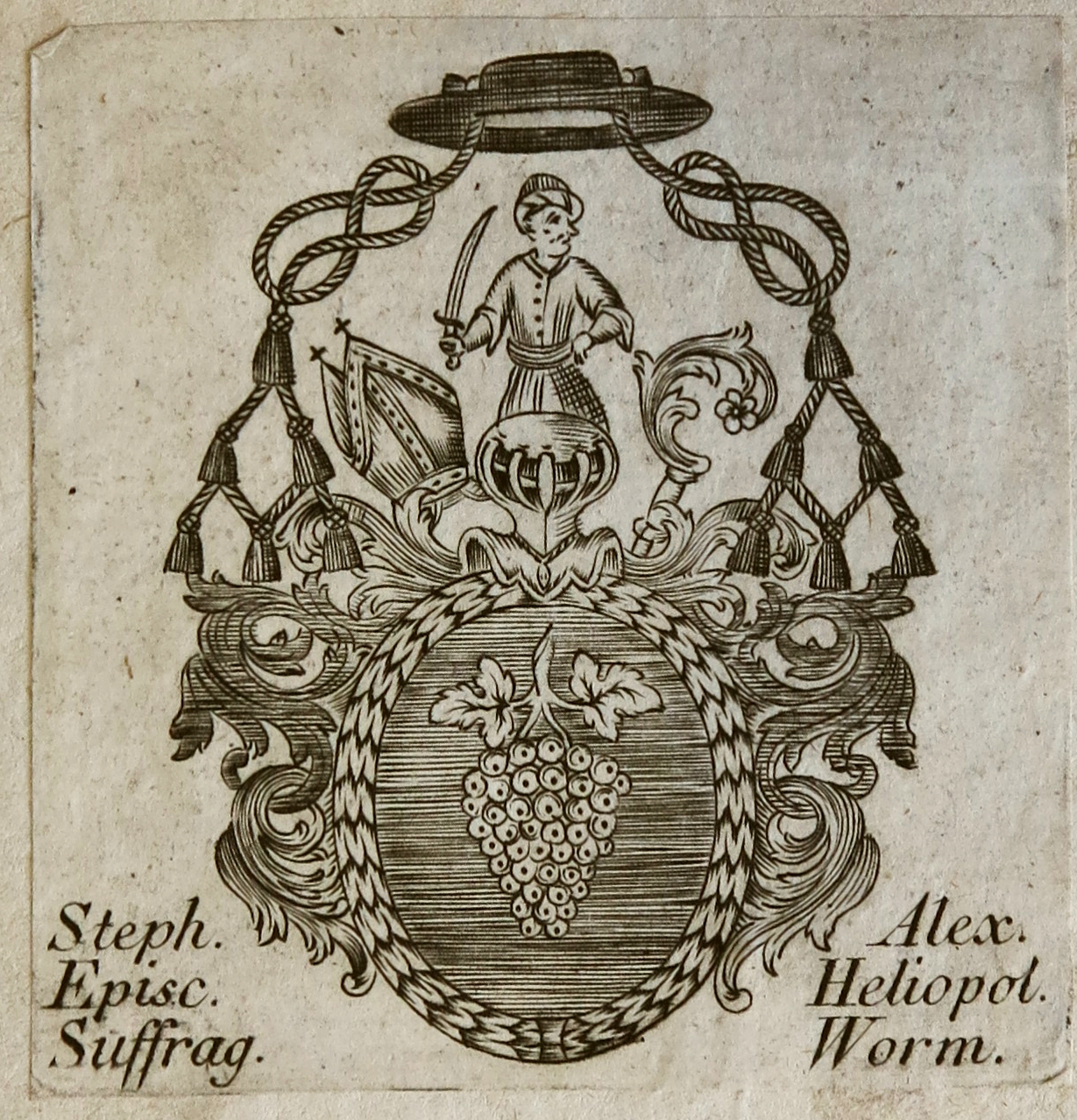
Exlibris Stephan Alexander Würdtwein

Würdtwein served under archbishops Johann Friedrich Karl von Ostein, Emmerich Joseph von Breidbach zu Bürresheim, and Friedrich Karl Joseph von Erthal, the last prince-elector and archbishop of the old Mainz electorate and of the ancien régime.

Johann Friedrich Karl von Ostein, also from Amorbach, offered Würdtwein a position as tutor to his nephew, Philipp Karl, and then as prebendary at the Stift St. Maria ad Gradus, where from 1762 to 1783 he also served as dean.

On the basis of his extensive study of canon law, he was honored in 1758 as geistlicher Rat and given a position on the Vicar general's council, the central power of the electorate. In 1767 he was promoted to the position of Fiskalis maior, a position in which he oversaw religious and moral life and ensured that religious guidelines were followed. In 1770 he became judicial vicar, the highest position in the Electorate besides the vicar general. His expertise was sought particularly in matters of marriage law and church law.

In 1783 he became auxiliary bishop and provicar of the Worms diocese, and later that year titular bishop of Heliopolis in Augustamnica.

== Scholarly work and honors ==
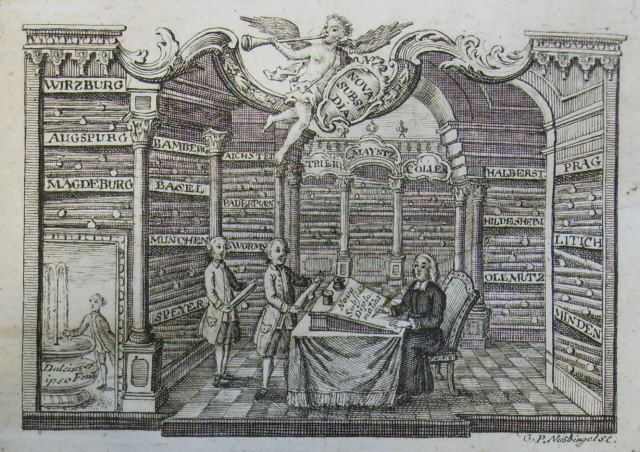
Stephan Alexander Würdtwein in his archive; contemporary engraving by Georg Paul Nussbiegel (1713–1776)

Würdtwein is considered a trailblazer in the source study of ecclesiastical and German history. Because the archives of the Electorate of Mainz were dispersed and partly destroyed, his publications are of great importance to Germania Sacra. He was respected during his lifetime as a scholar and writer during his lifetime, and was recognized by being chosen as an extraordinary member of the Kurpfälzische Akademie der Wissenschaften in 1765 (he became an honorary member in 1784), as a member of the Akademie gemeinnütziger Wissenschaften in Erfurt (1776), and as a member of the Bayerische Akademie der Wissenschaften in Munich (1781).
