= Carl Thomsen =

Danish painter & illustrator (1847–1912)

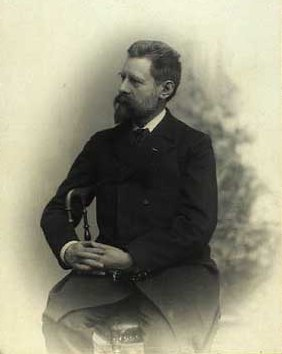
- Born: Carl Christian Frederik Jacob Thomsen; 6 April 1847; Copenhagen, Denmark
- Died: 4 October 1912 (aged 65)
- Occupations: painter, illustrator

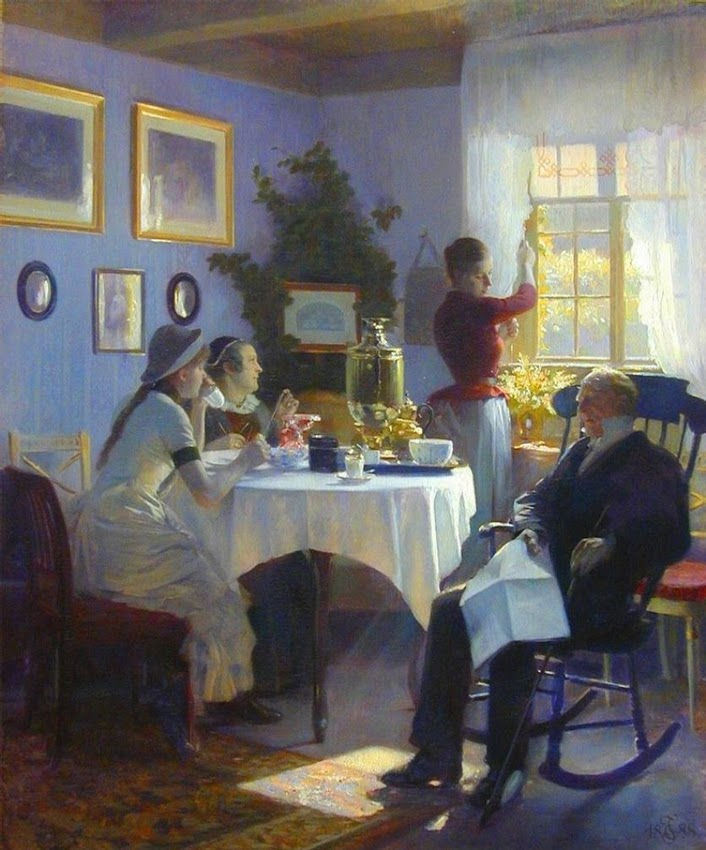
Carl Thomsen: En Søndag Eftermiddag (A Sunday Afternoon, 1888)

Carl Christian Frederik Jacob Thomsen (6 April 1847 – 4 October 1912) was a Danish painter and illustrator. He specialized in genre painting and also illustrated the works of several Danish authors.

== Biography ==
Born in Copenhagen, Thomsen was the son of Chamber Councillor (kammerråd) Ludvig Frederik Thomsen and the brother of the acclaimed linguist Vilhelm Thomsen (1842–1927). From an early age, Thomsen was interested in drawing but his parents first encouraged him to study philosophy. After he had graduated in 1866, he began studying art with Frederik Vermehren the same year. He then attended the Royal Danish Academy of Fine Arts under Wilhelm Marstrand, graduating in 1871. He completed his studies in Italy at the end of the 1870s together with Kristian Zahrtmann and August Jerndorff.

Thomsen exhibited in Carlottenborg from 1869. His earlier works include the genre paintings Ved eksamensbordet (At the Examination Desk, 1874) and Moder og datter (Mother and Daughter, 1875). In 1888, his Middag i en præstegård efter en bispevisitats (Dinner in a Rectory after a Bishop's Visit) earned him several awards including the Neuhausen Prize and gold medals in Munich and Antwerp. Unlike some of his contemporaries, Thomsen did not follow any of the modern trends from Paris but maintained his Historicist approach, often painting literary subjects.

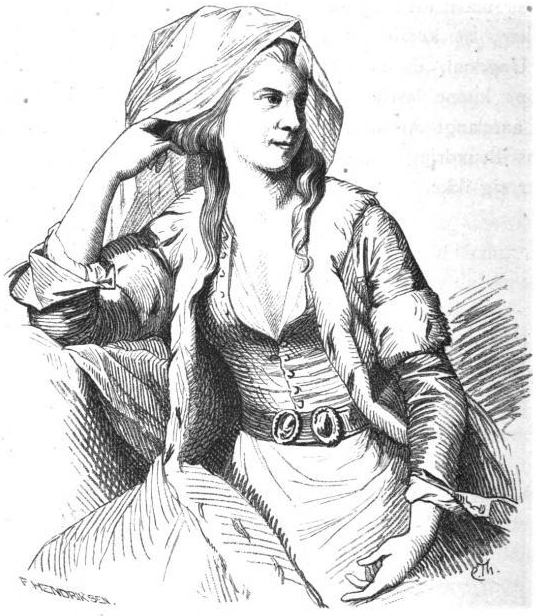
Thomsen's drawing of Danish actress Marie Cathrine Preisler in Dansk Skuespilkunst (1880)

As an illustrator, he contributed woodcuts to both books and journals including works by Adam Oehlenschläger, Johan Ludvig Heiberg, Steen Steensen Blicher and B.S. Ingemann. In 1901, he became a professor of the Royal Danish Academy.

== Awards ==
In 1887, Thomsen was awarded the Eckersberg Medal and, in 1888, the Thorvaldsen Medal. In 1892, he was decorated a Knight of the Order of the Dannebrog.

== Literature ==
- Christiansen, Peter (1939). Carl Thomsen som illustrator, en karakteristik og et bidrag til dansk bogillustrations historie. Gyldendal.
