= Johann Justin Preissler =

German painter and draughtsman

- Portrait of Johann Justin Preissler engraved by his brother Valentin Daniel, after his self-portrait
- Born: 4 December 1698; Nuremberg, Holy Roman Empire
- Died: 18 February 1771 (aged 72); Nuremberg, Holy Roman Empire
- Occupation: Engraver
- Father: Johann Daniel Preissler

Johann Justin Preissler (4 December 1698 – 18 February 1771) was a German Baroque painter and draughtsman.

== Biography ==
Preissler was born and died in Nuremberg. He was the son and pupil of Johann Daniel Preissler and the brother of Georg Martin and Johan Martin. Like his father before him, he travelled extensively throughout Italy, visiting Venice, Florence, Rome and Naples. In Rome he worked closely with the antiquarian and collector Philipp von Stosch. Preissler delivered numerous detailed gem drawings to Stosch, including notable pieces like a carnelian intaglio of Perseus and Andromeda. He also attended the French Academy in Rome, where he met the Neoclassical sculptor Edmé Bouchardon. Preissler translated several of Bouchardon's red-chalk drawings and copies of classical sculptures into widely distributed copper engravings. On his return he married the glasspainter Susanna Maria Dorsch (1738). He became director of the Nuremberg's Academy of Fine Arts (founded by his father) in 1742, and in 1752 he became director of the drawing academy. His copies of the ceiling pieces by Rubens and Van Dyck in the Carolus Borromeuskerk were published by his brother Georg Martin in 1735. They form a historic record of the originals, as the church was struck by lightning in 1718, causing a fire which destroyed the roof. The Teylers Museum in Haarlem has a copy of this book, as well as other works by Preissler.

== Gallery ==
Statue of Zeus ebgraved by Preissler for Raymond Leplat's Recueil des marbres, 1733

Statue of Zeus for Leplat's Recueil des marbres, 1733

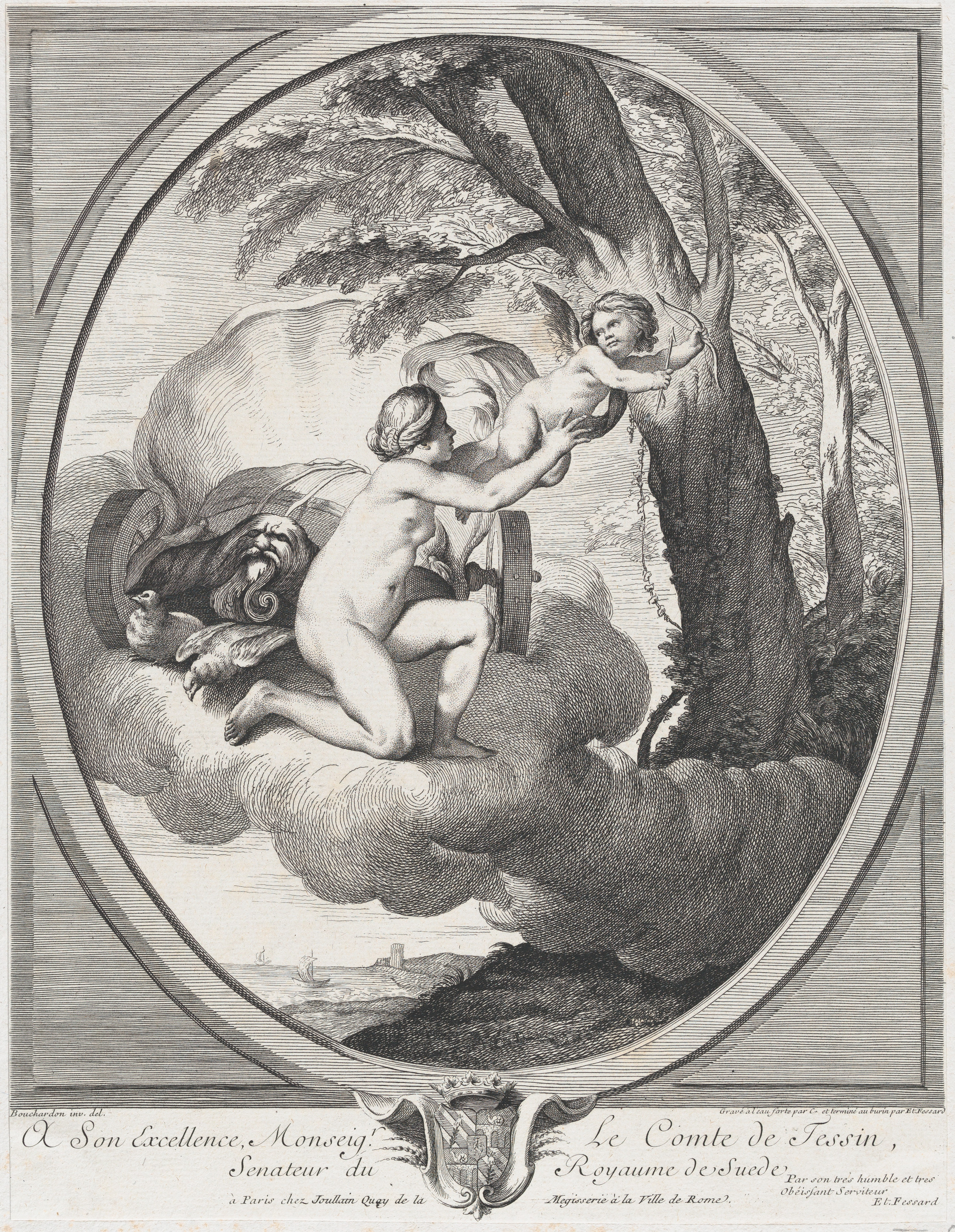
Venus and Cupid on a Cloud, Metropolitan Museum of Art, New York

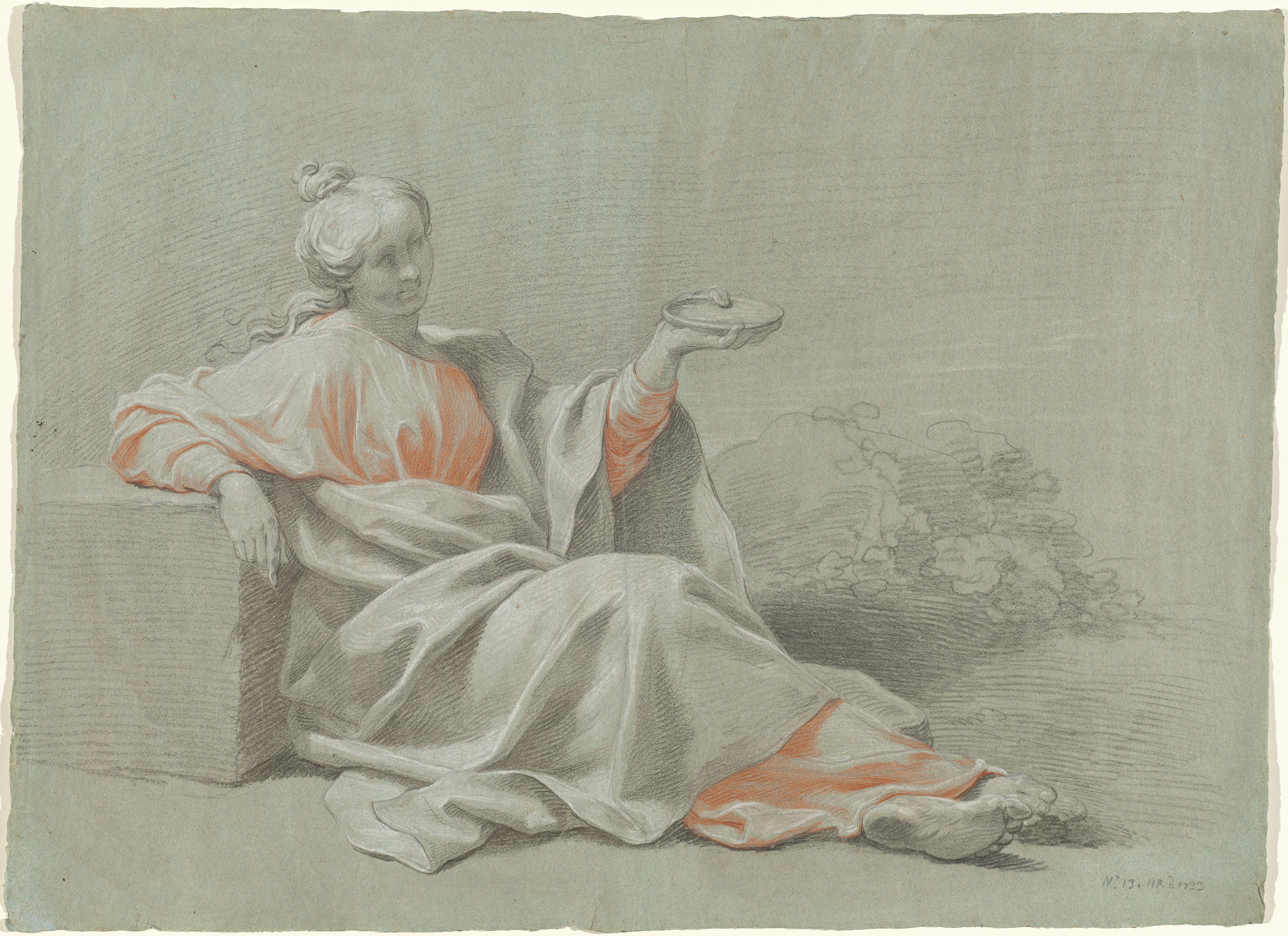
Young Woman with a Bowl, black, red, and white chalks over graphite on blue wove paper, 46.3 x 62.9 cm, National Gallery of Art, Washington, D.C.

== Bibliography ==
- Franz Friedrich Leitschuh (1888). "Preisler, Johann Justin" . Allgemeine Deutsche Biographie (in German). Vol. 26. Leipzig: Duncker & Humblot. p. 551.
