= Georg Haas (engraver) =

Danish engraver

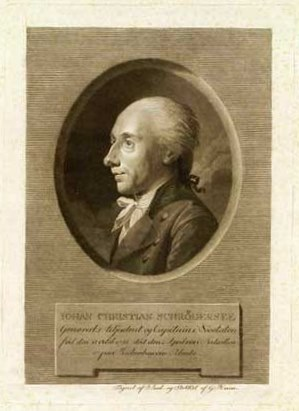
Johan Christian Schrødersee (1754-1801), Danish naval officer, engraving by Georg Haas, 1801

Georg Christian Wilhelm Haas (5 June 1751 or 1756 – 10 May 1817) was a Danish engraver.

Born and initially working in Hamburg, two of his brothers Peter and Meno, and his father Jonas all were engravers. Haas visited as a child the Royal Danish Academy of Fine Arts, where he quickly made much progress in art. In 1776, when he was 20–21 years old, he won the gold medal. This brought the right to go abroad as the Academy "boarder", but travel grants seemed slow in coming and were both few and small, for Haas' case only 100 Rdl. customary annual two or three years. Although one in Paris would not get far with this insignificant sum, it gave Haas, however, enough to get on the road to France's capital, where he arrived and was able to study under Nicolas de Launays and Johan Frederik Clemens. After in 1781 to have had his scarce scholarship increased and prolonged studied Haas eagerly went ahead and completed in 1782 a beautiful wall Diomedes eaten up by his own horses. On the basis of this, Haas was a member of the Academy in Paris and also in January 1783 the Academy in Copenhagen, to which city he almost simultaneously thus returned.

Being a member of two academies was a prudent, but Haas needed to find employment. But he had difficulties with this, because the time was cool to both the arts and artists. In addition, there was no shortage of engravers in Denmark, and there were more artists than Haas (Clemens, Johan Martin Preisler) . Haas searched in vain for a professorship at the model school, and unsuccessfully for free residence at Kunsthal Charlottenborg, nothing would initially succeed him. He got the title of hofkobberstikker and an annual allowance of the King's box, but the work was limited, and his circumstances were cramped. In 1810 he managed to become a professor at the model school, but this late tailwind did not improve his circumstances, he was poor and remained poor. In 1811 he was auditor and treasurer at the Academy.

Haas was already an old man when he in 1809 got the time and could afford to marry. His wife was called Johanne Christine, née Sønderup. Haas died in Copenhagen on 10 May 1817; his wife died in 1835. Haas is buried in Assistens Cemetery.
