= Georg Paul Nussbiegel =

- Illustrated title page of Johann Christoph Georg Bodenschatz' Bibliotheca Rabbinica Philologica, 1748–1749
- Born: 1713; Nuremberg, Free Imperial City of Nuremberg
- Died: 1776 or 1778; Nuremberg, Free Imperial City of Nuremberg
- Education: Georg Martin Preisler; Johann Balthasar Probst; Bernhard Vogel
- Occupations: Draftsman, copperplate engraver, art dealer and publisher
- Movement: Baroque

Georg Paul Nussbiegel (also known as Georg Peter Nussbiegel; 1713 – 1776 or 1778) was a German draftsman, copperplate engraver, art dealer and publisher based in Nuremberg.

== Biography ==
Georg Paul Nussbiegel was born in Nuremberg in 1713. He studied under the painter and copperplate engraver Georg Martin Preisler in Nuremberg and continued his training in Augsburg under Johann Balthasar Probst and Bernhard Vogel. He was registered as a copperplate engraver in Nuremberg from 1755 to 1786, and his name was not removed from the register until 1787.

Nussbiegel primarily produced portraits based on paintings by prominent German artists, as well as illustrations for the Bible published by Fleischmann in 1763 (Hohenlohesche Bibel). He also created scientific illustrations for natural history books. Initially, Adolf von Hüpsch planned to have his Naturgeschichte des Niederdeutschlands (Natural History of the Low Countries) published and illustrated by Nussbiegel. However, the publication was delayed and only realised after Nussbiegel's death by the publisher Gabriel Nicolaus Raspe. Nussbiegel had however engraved several plates for the work.

In 1771, Nussbiegel was made a member of the Nuremberg's Academy of Fine Arts. He died in his native city in 1776 or 1778. Following his death, his son, Johann Nussbiegel, took over his father's workshop. Johann studied perspective under Johann Thomas Stettner and attended Nuremberg's Academy of Fine Arts, where he was taught by Johann Justin Preissler. He illustrated works by the Swiss philosopher, poet and theologian Johann Kaspar Lavater, and produced engravings based on designs by Daniel Chodowiecki. Like his father, he engraved illustrations for scientific books, including Johann David Schoepff's Naturgeschichte der Schildkröten (1792–1801) and Peter Simon Pallas' Icones insectorum praesertim Rossiae Sibiriaeque peculiarium (1781–1798). He died in Nuremberg on 6 May 1833.

== Gallery ==
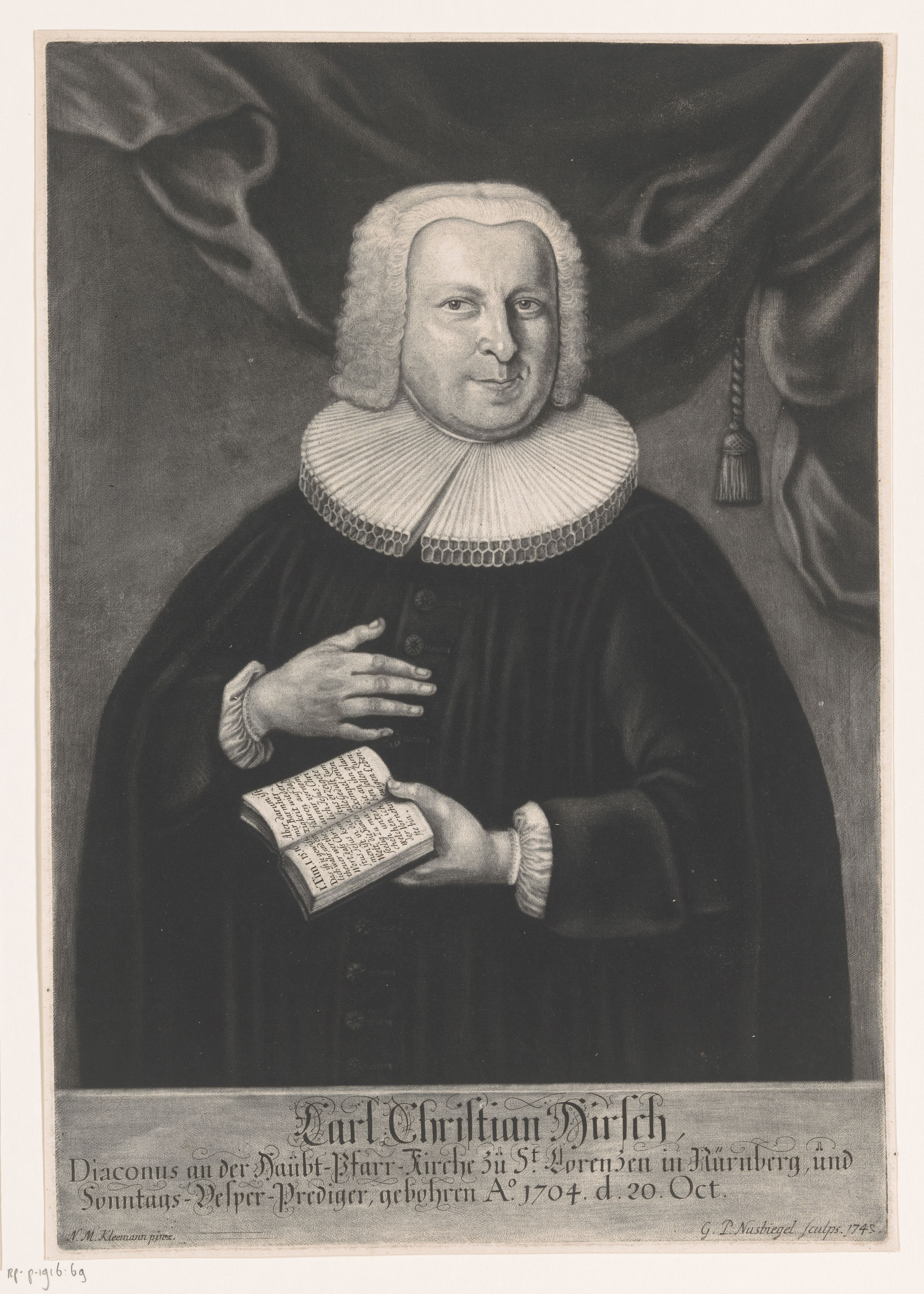
Portrait of Carl Christian Hirsch

Portrait of Christian Gotlieb Schwarz

Portrait of Christoph Wilhelm Staudner

Portrait of Johann Balthasar Bernhold

Portrait of Nicolaus Ernst Zobel

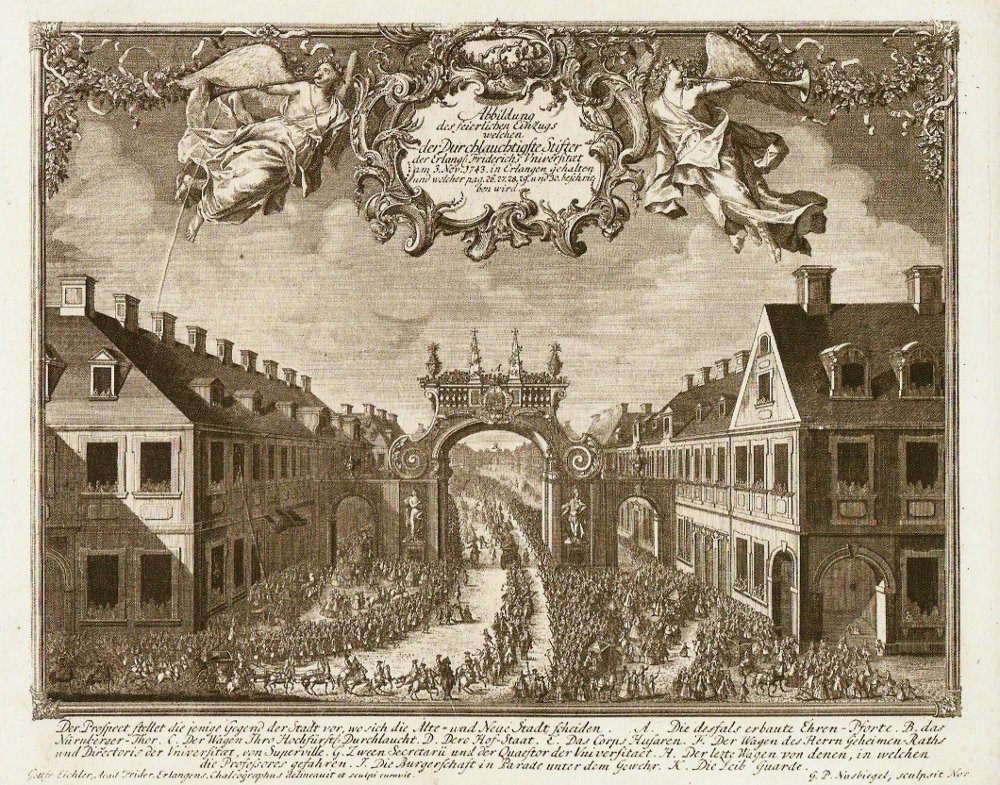
Parade at the inauguration of the University of Erlangen

== Bibliography ==
- Hans Vollmer, ed. (1931). "Nusbiegel, Georg Paul". Allgemeines Lexikon der Bildenden Künstler von der Antike bis zur Gegenwart. Begründet von Ulrich Thieme und Felix Becker. Vol. 25: Moehring–Olivié. Leipzig: E.A. Seemann. pp. 538–539.
- "Nusbiegel, Georg Peter or Paul". Benezit Dictionary of Artists. Oxford: Oxford University Press. 2011. doi:10.1093/benz/9780199773787.article.B00131841.
