= Lorenz Natter =

German gem-engraver and medallist

Johann Lorenz Natter (1705–1763) was a German gem-engraver and medallist.

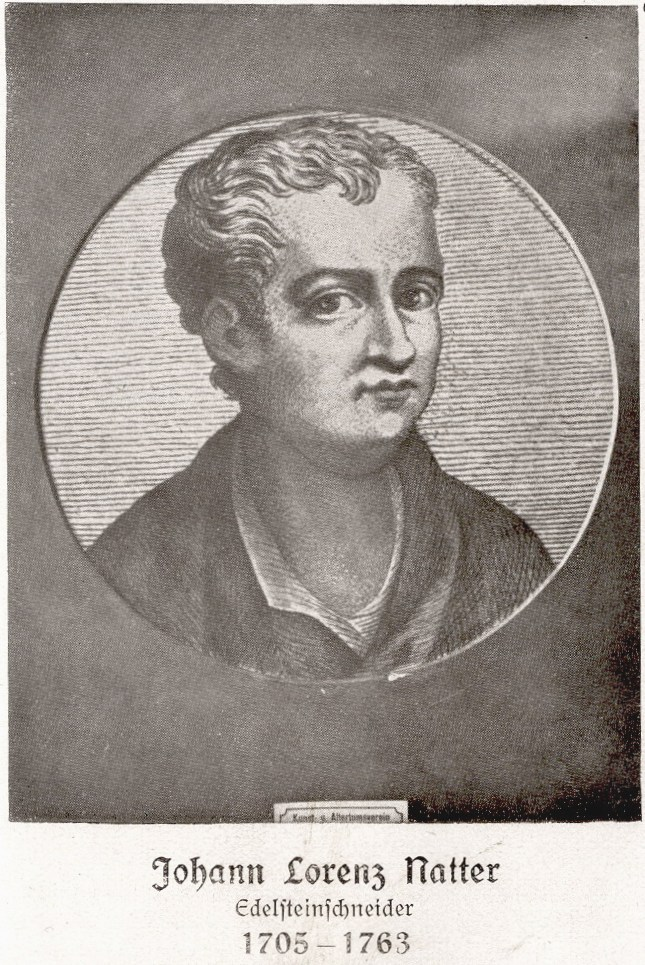
Lorenz Natter

== Life ==
Lorenz was born 21 March 1705 at Biberach in Suabia. There he for six years was in business as a jeweller, and then worked for the same period in Switzerland, where he had relatives. At Berne he was taught by the seal-cutter Johann Rudolph Ochs. He then went to study in Italy, and at Venice took up gem-engraving.

On coming to Rome Natter was, on his own account, employed by the Chevalier Odam to copy the Venus of Vettori, to make a Danae of it, and put the supposed engraver's name Aulus to it. For this engraved stone, as well as for others copied by him from the antique, Natter found purchasers. At Florence he was employed by Baron Philipp von Stosch.

In 1741 or earlier, Natter came to England to work as a medallist and gem-engraver, bringing with him from Italy a collection of antique gems and sulphur casts. In 1743 he visited, in company with Martin Tuscher of Nuremberg, Denmark, Sweden, and St. Petersburg. Christian VI of Denmark gave him a room in his palace, where he worked at gem and die cutting for nearly a year. He was well paid, and presented by the king with a gold medal. Horace Walpole wrote that Natter visited Holland in 1746. He returned to England in or before 1754, and appears to have remained there till the summer of 1762. He became a Fellow of the Society of Antiquaries of London in 1755, and of the Royal Society in 1757.

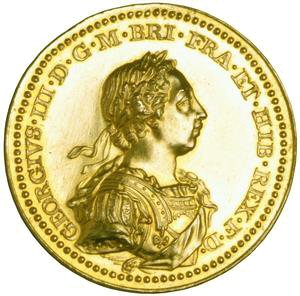
Lorenz Natter, coronation medal of George III of Great Britain

According to Rogers Ruding, Natter was employed as engraver or assistant-engraver at the English Royal Mint at the beginning of the reign of George III. In the summer of 1762 Natter went to work in St. Petersburg, and died there of asthma, late in the autumn of 1763.

== Works ==
Natter's talents as a gem-engraver were praised by Goethe, and Charles William King called him "one of the greatest of the modern practitioners of the art". His first productions were mainly seals with coats of arms. Writing in 1754, he said that he was always willing to receive commissions to copy ancient gems, but stated that he never sold copies as originals; his productions were often signed. His usual signature on gems was NATTEP or NATTHP. He also often signs YΔROΣ or YΔROY, a translation of the German word natter, a water-snake. Georg Kaspar Nagler in his Künstler-Lexikon, and Heinrich Bolzenthal, followed in Edward Hawkins's Medallic Illustrations, gave Natter's forenames as "Johann Lorenz"; Natter on his gems and medals and on the title-pages of his publications used only the Christian name "Lorenz" (or Laurent, Laurentius, etc.).

In Florence from 1732 to 1735 Natter had as patron Gian Gastone de' Medici, Grand Duke of Tuscany, for whom he made a portrait of the Grand Duke himself, and one of Cardinal Alessandro Albani. In 1733 he made at Florence a portrait-medal of Charles Sackville, Earl of Middlesex. This is signed L. Natter F. Florent. Natter himself does not mention visiting the Netherlands, but he was patronised by William IV of Orange and his family, and made for them portraits in intaglio and portrait-medals. At this period Natter was attacked by Pierre-Jean Mariette in Traité des pierres gravées (1750), as a self-conscious forger.

During Natter's two visits to England he was patronised by the royal family, and in 1741 made the medal "Tribute to George II". He was supported by Sir Edward Walpole and by Thomas Hollis. He engraved two or three seals with the head of Sir Robert Walpole, and produced a medal of him with a bust from John Michael Rysbrach's model, with on the reverse a statue of Cicero with the legend, "Regit dictis animos". This medal was engraved in The Medalist (Hawkins), with the legend altered to "Regit nummis animos". Natter, when at Count Moltke's table in Denmark, mentioned this alteration, and someone suggested "Regit nummis animos et nummis regitur ipse", a motto which was later engraved on the edge of some specimens of the medals, one of which went to the British Museum. For Hollis, Natter engraved, for ten guineas, a seal with the head of Britannia, and also a cameo of "Britannia Victrix", with a head of Algernon Sydney on the reverse. He also engraved a portrait of Hollis in intaglio, and a head of Socrates in green jasper which Hollis presented to Archbishop Thomas Secker in 1757.

Gems engraved by Natter were described by Erich Raspe in his Catalogue of the Tassie Collection. Among Natter's imitations of the antique was his copy of the Medusa, with the name Sosikles, at that time in the cabinet of Tiberius Hemsterhuis, a correspondent of Natter's. He also copied the "Julia Titi of Evodus". A description of his works preserved in the Imperial Cabinet at St. Petersburg was given in J. Bernoulli's Travels, iv. 248.

=== Books ===
Natter published in 1754 A Treatise on the Ancient Method of Engraving on Precious Stones compared with the Modern, London; it was also published in French in the same year as Traité de la méthode antique de graver en pierres fines. In Natter gave practical instructions in gem-engraving, and strongly advised beginners to copy from the antique. Godefrid Kraft of Danzig is mentioned by him, as a pupil of his in engraving. The Treatise did much for his reputation, but in financial terms proved troublesome.

Natter also worked for the Dukes of Devonshire and Marlborough. For George Spencer, 4th Duke of Marlborough he drew up a catalogue of the Bessborough gems, which were incorporated with the Marlborough cabinet. This was published in 1761 as Catalogue des pierres gravées tant en relief qu'en creux de Mylord Comte de Bessborough, London, with plates.

== Notes ==
Attribution

This article incorporates text from a publication now in the public domain: Lee, Sidney, ed. (1894). "Natter, Lorenz". Dictionary of National Biography. Vol. 40. London: Smith, Elder & Co.
