= Johann Georg Preisler =

Danish painter (1757–1831)

Johann Georg Preisler or Preissler (7 July 1757 – 21 April 1831) was a Danish engraver of German origin.

== Early life and education ==
Johann Georg Preisler was born in Copenhagen, the son of Anna Sophia (born Schuckmann) and Johan Martin Preisler, an engraver himself and professor at the Royal Danish Academy of Fine Arts in Copenhagen. He was thus a member of the German Preisler family of artists of Nuremberg. Preisler was first student at the Royal Danish Academy where he obtained the gold medal in 1780.

In 1781, he departed for Paris, passing through Hamburg where he visited his father's friend Friedrich Gottlieb Klopstock. He stayed then in the French capital until 1788 where he studied with engraver Jean-Georges Wille.

== Career ==
Back in Copenhagen, he became engraver of the King, professor and member of the Royal Danish Academy.

== Personal life ==
He married Anna Rebecca Pflueg (1767-1817) in 1788. He died in Lyngby in 1831.

== Bibliography ==
- (in German) Franz Friedrich Leitschuh, "Preisler, Johann Georg", in: Allgemeine Deutsche Biographie, Vol. 26, Leipzig: Duncker & Humblot, 1888, p. 552.
- (in German) Karl Bosl, Bayerische Biographie, Regensburg, 1983, p. 601
- (in German) Georg Kaspar Nagler, Neues allgemeines Künstler-Lexicon, vol. 12, Munich, 1842 (online version), p. 34.
- (in German) F. J. Meier, "Preisler, Johan Georg", in: Carl Frederik Bricka (ed.), Dansk biografisk leksikon, 1st ed., vol. 13, Gyldendal, Copenhagen, 1899 (online version), pp. 279 ff.

The present article is largely a translation of the article Johann Georg Preisser on the German Wikipedia
