= Joachim-Daniel Preisler =

Danish actor

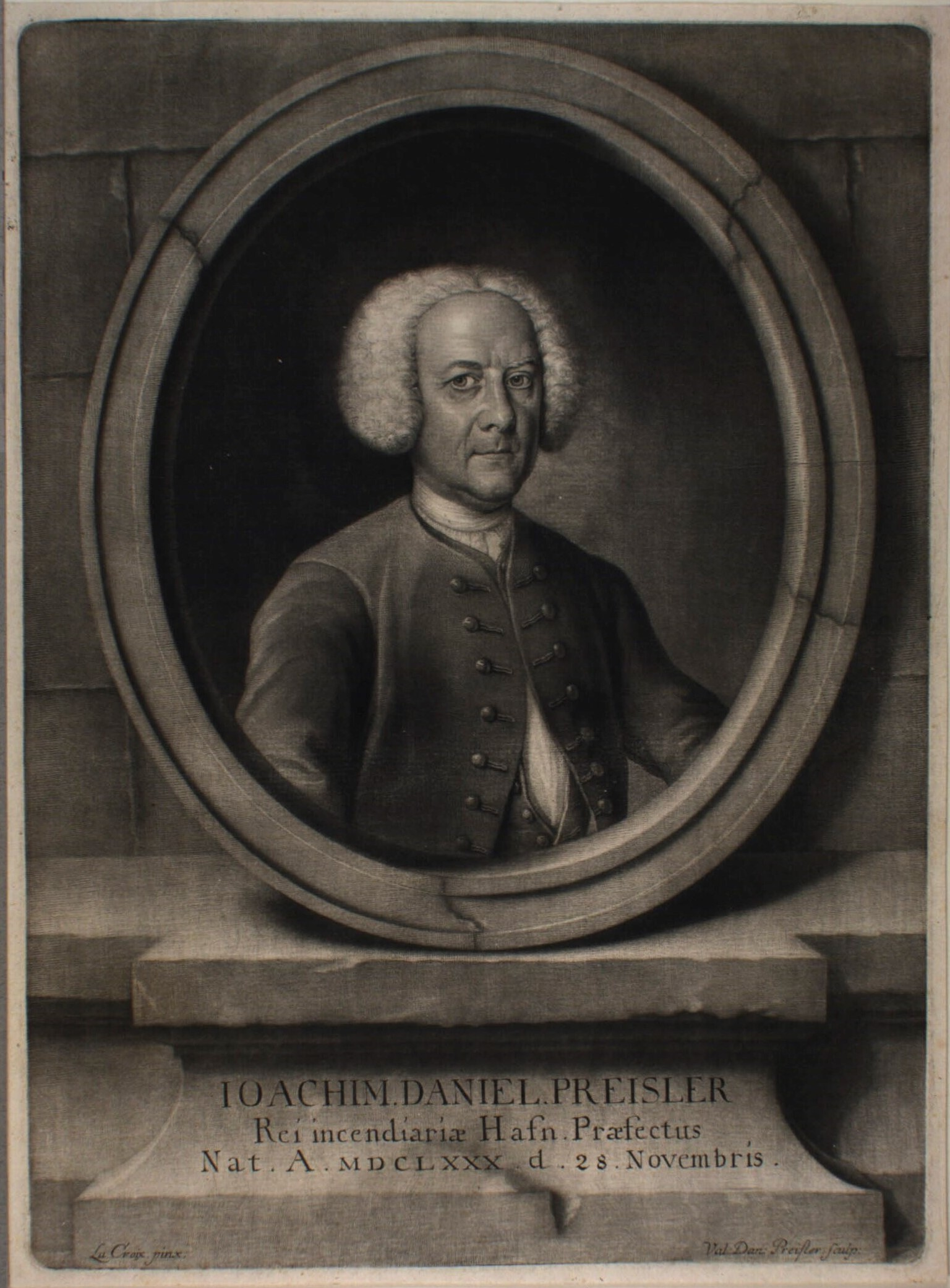
- Portrait by
- Born: 16 November 1755; Copenhagen, Denmark
- Died: 2 April 1809 (aged 53); Copenhagen, Denmark
- Occupation: Actor
- Years active: 1779-
- Spouse: Marie Cathrine Preisler (m. 1778)

Joachim Daniel Preisler (born in Copenhagen on 16 November 1755 – 2 April 1809) was a Danish actor.

== Early life and education ==
Joachim Daniel Preisler was born on 16 November 1755 in Copenhagen as the son of Johan Martin Preisler, a renowned professor at the Royal Danish Academy of Fine Arts. In his childhood, the German intellectual community of the day in Denmark, first among whom was the poet Klopstock, used to gather at his parents house. The young Joachim Daniel impressed the guests by speaking perfectly French, German, and Danish, reciting poetries, singing, and playing the piano or the violin.

== Acting career ==
After having studied theology, he fell for actress Marie Cathrine Devegge whom he married on 4 December 1778. A few months later he made his debut as an actor on 26 January 1779. His good looks and hard work helped him becoming rapidly a popular actor, able to play both tragic or comic roles, or deceitful ones such as Tartuffe by Molière or Loki in the Death of Baldur by Johannes Ewald. He is remembered among others for his impressive rendition of the character of Prince Gonzaga in Emilia Galotti by Lessing, where he excelled in displaying the ambiguity of the role which reflected to some extent his own character

Preisler made various study tours in 1786 and 1787 to Hamburg to the theater of Friedrich Ludwig Schröder. In 1788, he went to France and Germany at the request of the Danish Royal Theater in Copenhagen to study the conditions prevailing in theaters there.

Preisler's life remained erratic. On 16 April 1792, he left hastily Copenhagen with a young debutante, played for a while theatre in Germany, remarried later actress Wilhelmine Caroline Reimann, and finished his career - greatly diminished- as a prompter at the Danish Royal Theater

== Written works ==
Preisler published a journal in two volumes of his travels in which he describes his encounters with several of the day's celebrities. In August 1788 he met Mozart in Vienna and writes:

"There I had the happiest hour of music that has ever fallen to my lot. This small man and great master twice extemporized on a pedal pianoforte, so wonderfully! so wonderfully! that I quite lost myself. He intertwined the most difficult passages with the most lovely themes. - His wife cut quill-pens for the copyist, a pupil composed, a little boy aged four walked about in the garden and sang recitatives - in short, everything that surrounded this splendid man was music. I thought with pleasure of his Entführung aus dem Serail that I heard in Hamburg in 1787, but he called this Operette a trifle (Kleinigkeit). It would be unworthy of a man like Mozart to be praised by men who themselves count for nothing so I remained silent. He is writing church music in Vienna and inasmuch as the Singspiel (Operette) has come to an end he has nothing more to do with the theater"

In 1802 Preisler published a play called Die Invaliden oder der Triumph des 2. April and later an autobiographic novel entitled Ferdinand Braun, der Gothe.

== Bibliography ==
- (da) Edvard Brandes, Dansk Skuespilkunst, p. 134 et seq.
- (da) Sophius Birket-Smith, Til Belysning af literære Personer og Forhold, p. 185 et seq. (letters to P.A. Heiberg)
- (da) Skuespillerforeningens Julebog, 1893, p. 116 et seq.
- (da) Will. Behrend, Aarbog for musik 1923, 1924, P. 123-26
- (da) Torben Krogh, Danske teaterbilleder, 1932, p. 83-88
- (da) Fr. Schyberg, Den store teaterrejse, 1943
- Preisler, Joachim Daniel, Journal over en rejde igiennem Frankerige og Tyskland 1788, published 1789 in Copenhagen by Christian Frederik Holm
- Preisler, Joachim Daniel, Die Invaliden oder der Triumph des 2. April, 1802, Copenhagen
- Preisler, Joachim Daniel, Ferdinand Braun, der Gothe, Romantsche Biographie, first volume, 1802 (following volumes never published)
