= Meno Haas =

German-born copperplate engraver, miniaturist, illustrator and painter

- Born: 6 April 1752; Hamburg
- Died: 16 October 1833 (aged 81); Berlin
- Style: copperplate engraving

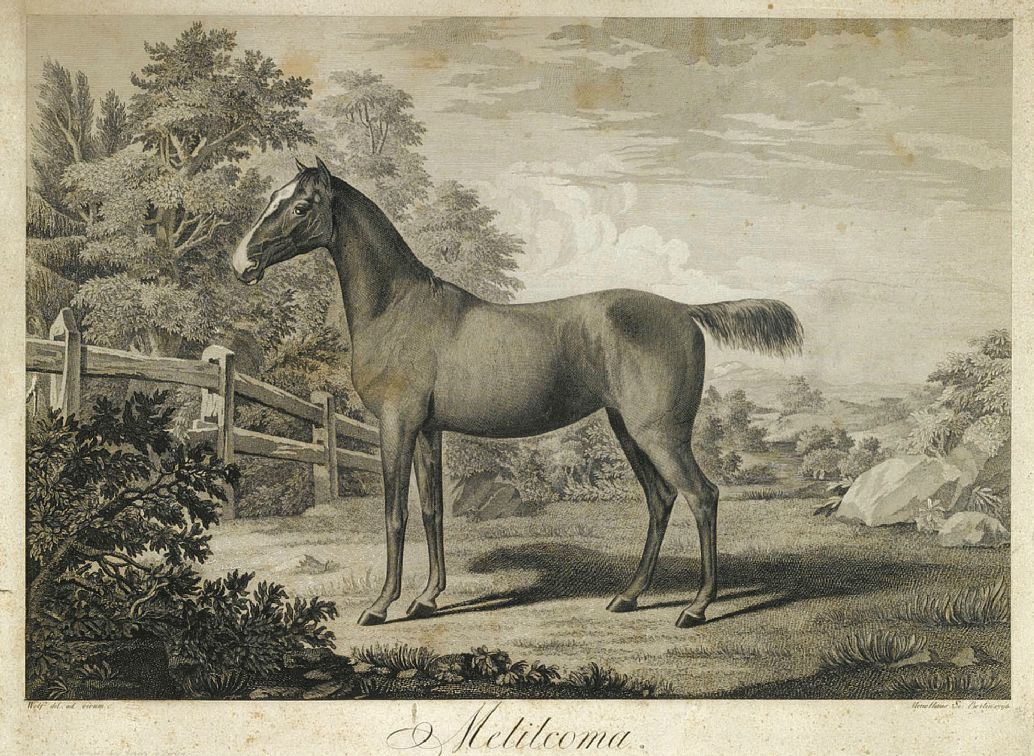
Stallion "Melilcoma", engraving by Meno Haas

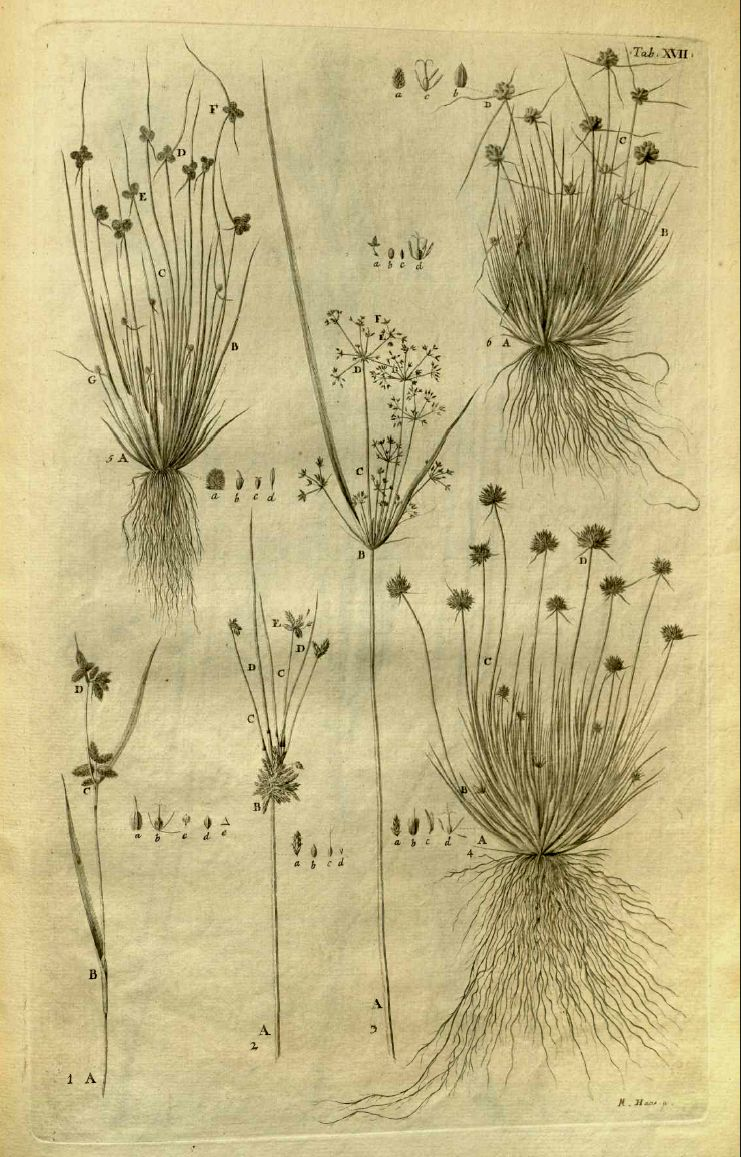
Plate of Cyperaceae from Rottbøll's "Descriptionum et iconum rariores"

Meno Haas aka Johann Meno Haas (6 April 1752 – 16 October 1833) was a German-born copperplate engraver, miniaturist, illustrator and painter. He was the brother of George and Peter Haas, and father of Jean Meno Haas. Meno was the son and student of the engraver Jonas Haas. He also trained under Johann Georg Preisler at the Academy of Copenhagen

== Life ==
Haas was only a year old when his family moved to Copenhagen. There he spent much time at the Academy, listening to his father and Johan Martin Preisler's teaching. In 1778 he became an engraver attached to the University.

In 1782 he went to Paris, moving there with his younger brother Johan-Jakob-Georg Haas, another engraver. There he worked under Nicolas de Launay. In 1786 he accepted a commission to copy art works in the Berlin Gallery and became a member of the Academy of Berlin in 1793. Haas worked for a number of booksellers, engraving plates by contemporary German painters.

His wife, Birgitte Cathrine born Hortulan, was the fifth of the Holberg actor Marcus Ulsøe Hortulan's seven children.

== Publications with engravings by Meno Haas ==
- "Icones plantarum selectarum Horti Regii Botanici Berolinensis cum descriptionibus et colendi ratione" – H.F. Link & F. Otto (Berlin 1820).
- "Descriptionum et iconum rariores et pro maxima parte novas plantas illustrantium.conscriptus a Christiano Friis" – Rottbøll, Christen Friis (1727–1797). Abildgaard, Nicolai,(1743–1809). Haas, Georg, (1756–1817). Haas, Meno,(1752–1833). (Hafniae 1773)
- Carsten Niebuhr, Reisebeschreibung nach Arabien und andern umliegenden Ländern (Kopenhagen, 1774).

== Selected works ==
- Crown Prince Frederik and his companion at play (1771/2), after Peter Cramer and John Mandelberg
- Illustrations and vignettes for Carsten Niebuhr's: "Reisebeschreibung nach Arabien", 1774–76
- Illustrations and vignettes for Pehr Forsskål's "Icones Rerum Naturalium", 1776
- Portrait of Otto Friedrich Müller, after Cornelius Høyer (1776)
- Lorenz Spengler, after Cornelius Høyer (1776)
- Engraving of members of the royal house (1777–79), including Crown Prince Frederik (VI) after Cornelius Høyer
- Anne Colbiørnsen, after Erik Pauelsen (1780)
- Rolf Krake, the legendary Danish king, and his men, after Erik Pauelsen (1782)
- "Hagar's Repudiation", after Anthonisz Flinck (1789)
- The German federal princes, after Bernhard Rode (1793)
- Frederick I of Prussia, after Christian Horneman (1798)
- His queen Louise, after H. Plötz
- Danish actor Hans Christian Knudsen, after Jens Juel (1800)
- Frederick II on horseback, after L. Wolf (1808)
- Christian Vilhelm Duntzfelt, the Danish merchant, after Christian Horneman (1809)
