= Philipp Wilhelm Oeding =

German painter (1697–1781)

Philipp Wilhelm Oeding (born 15 January 1697 in Benzingerode and died in 1781 in Braunschweig) was a German painter who also painted miniatures.

== Biography ==
Philipp Wilhelm Oeding became in 1721 a pupil of the Academy of Fine Arts Nuremberg. He studied there with Johann Daniel Preissler and acquired in 1725 Nuremberg citizenship. In 1729, he married the painter Barbara Helena Preisler, a daughter of his teacher.

In 1724 Oeding moved to Altona and became Danish Court painter.

In 1746, he finally became a professor in painting at the Collegium Carolinum in Braunschweig.

== Bibliography ==
The present contribution is a translation of the German version of Wikipedia

- Manfred H. Grieb: Nürnberger Künstlerlexikon. Band 3, München 2007, S. 1095 (https://books.google.de/books?id=hoRcf4LFZUcC&pg=PA1095)
- Christian von Heusinger: Oeding, Philipp Wilhelm (Guillaume). In: Horst-Rüdiger Jarck, Dieter Lent u. a. (Ed.): https://de.wikipedia.org/wiki/Braunschweigisches_Biographisches_Lexikon. Appelhans Verlag, Braunschweig 2006, ISBN 3-937664-46-7, S. 533.
- Joseph Eduard Wessely: Oeding, Philipp Wilhelm (https://de.wikisource.org/wiki/ADB:Oeding,_Philipp_Wilhelm). In: Allgemeine Deutsche Biographie https://de.wikipedia.org/wiki/Allgemeine_Deutsche_Biographie (ADB). Band 24, Duncker & Humblot, Leipzig 1887, S. 150 f.
