= Peter Haas (engraver) =

German-Danish engraver (1754–1804)

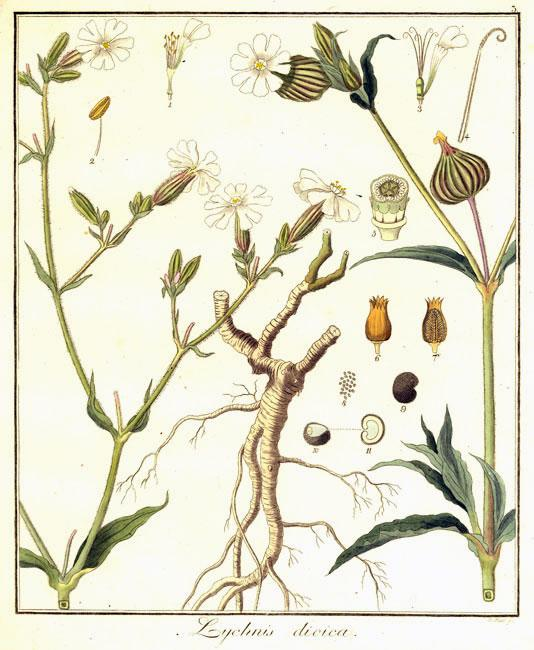
Lychnis dioica L. is a synonym of Silene dioica (L.) Clairv., hand-colored engraving by Peter Haas, 1809

Christian Peter Jonas Haas (12 April 1754 – 1804) was a German-Danish engraver, born and initially working in Copenhagen. Two of his brothers, Georg and Meno, and his father Jonas were all engravers. Haas engraved a number of plates documenting Carsten Niebuhr's travels in Arabia, idealizing and moralistic genre art works by Daniel Chodowiecki and related works by Erik Pauelsen. Haas, however, for economic reasons, also undertook to carry out commercial graphics such as business cards, embroidery patterns and almanacs. He elected in 1786 to follow his brother Meno to Berlin, where he continued his diverse business, including portrait miniatures, a series of Berlin Prospectuses, and a series of scenes from Frederick the Great's life. In Berlin he also came to meet Chodowiecki, and became a member of the academies of Paris and Copenhagen. He is represented in the Royal Collection.

== Sources ==
- "Haas, Peter". Kulturarv: Kunstindeks Danmark & Weilbachs Kunstnerleksikon.
- Andrup, Otto (1922). "Haas, Peter (Christian Peter Jonas)". In Willis, Fred C. (ed.). Allgemeines Lexikon der Bildenden Künstler von der Antike bis zur Gegenwart. Begründet von Ulrich Thieme und Felix Becker. Vol. 15: Gresse–Hanselmann. Leipzig: E. A. Seemann. pp. 391–392.
