= Karoline Preisler =

German politician and lawyer (born 1971)

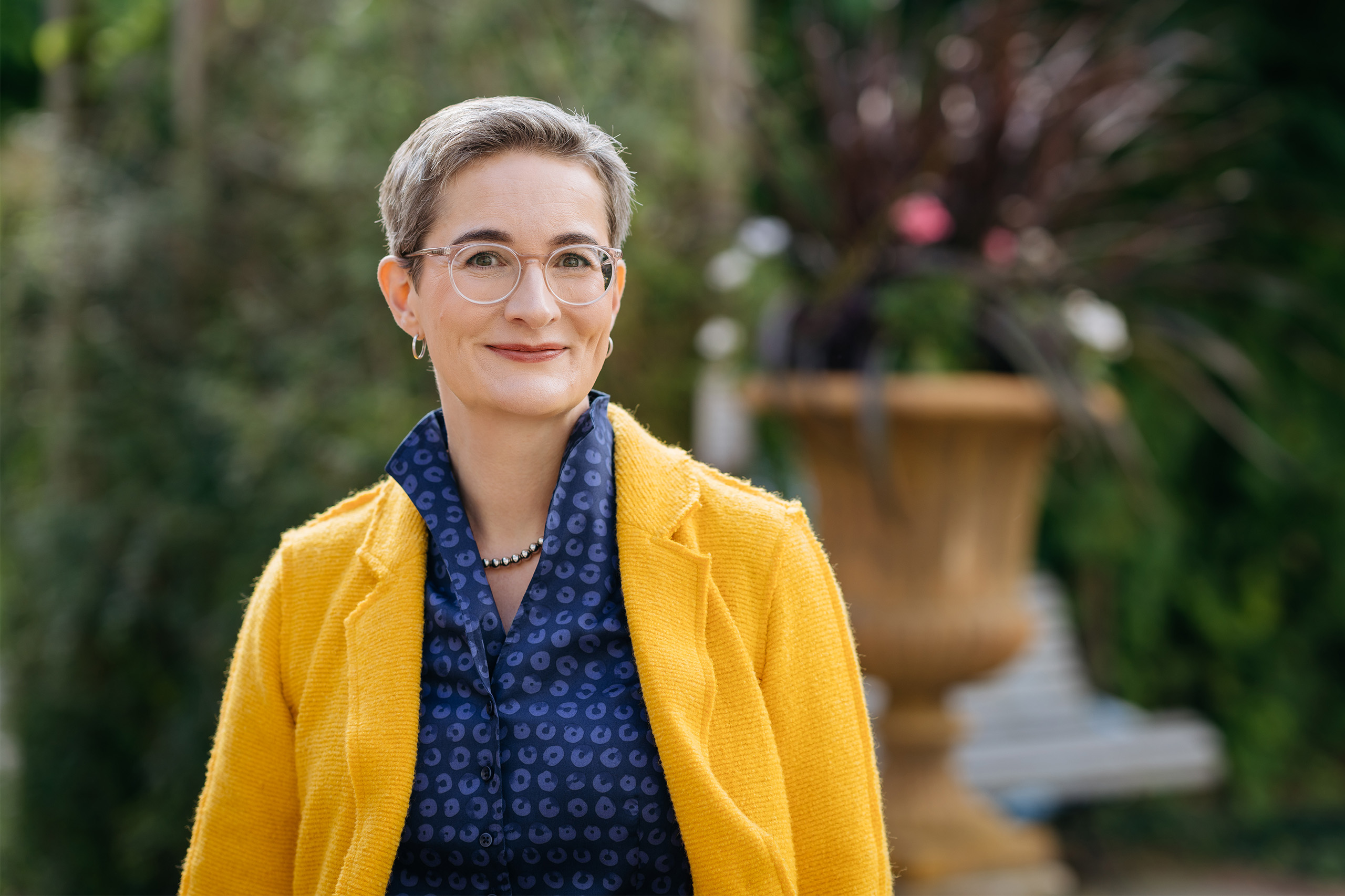
- Born: July 3, 1971 (age 55); East Berlin, German Democratic Republic (now Berlin, Germany)
- Occupations: Politician, lawyer

Karoline Preisler (born 3 July 1971 in East Berlin) is a German activist and politician. The lawyer is best known for her counter-protests at pro-Palestinian protests in Berlin.

== Education and career ==
Preisler attended high school in Berlin and studied law at the University of Potsdam. From 2004 to 2012 she worked as a lawyer in Berlin and subsequently in Barth, Germany.

Preisler joined the Free Democratic Party in 2013 and was initially active in local politics. From 2014 to 2023 she was chairwoman of the Arno Esch Foundation, a party-affiliated foundation of the FDP Mecklenburg-Vorpommern (Mecklenburg-Western Pomerania).

== Protests ==
Preisler attended demonstrations. She began with "one-woman counter-demonstrations" during the COVID pandemic. In March 2020 Preisler became infected with the coronavirus. She was initially quarantined at home with her children and then treated in a clinic. She reported on the course of the illness and the accompanying symptoms in a "corona diary" on Twitter. At demonstrations against the coronavirus measures, Preisler presented herself as a "voice of reason" and deliberately exposed herself to confrontation with supporters of opposing beliefs.

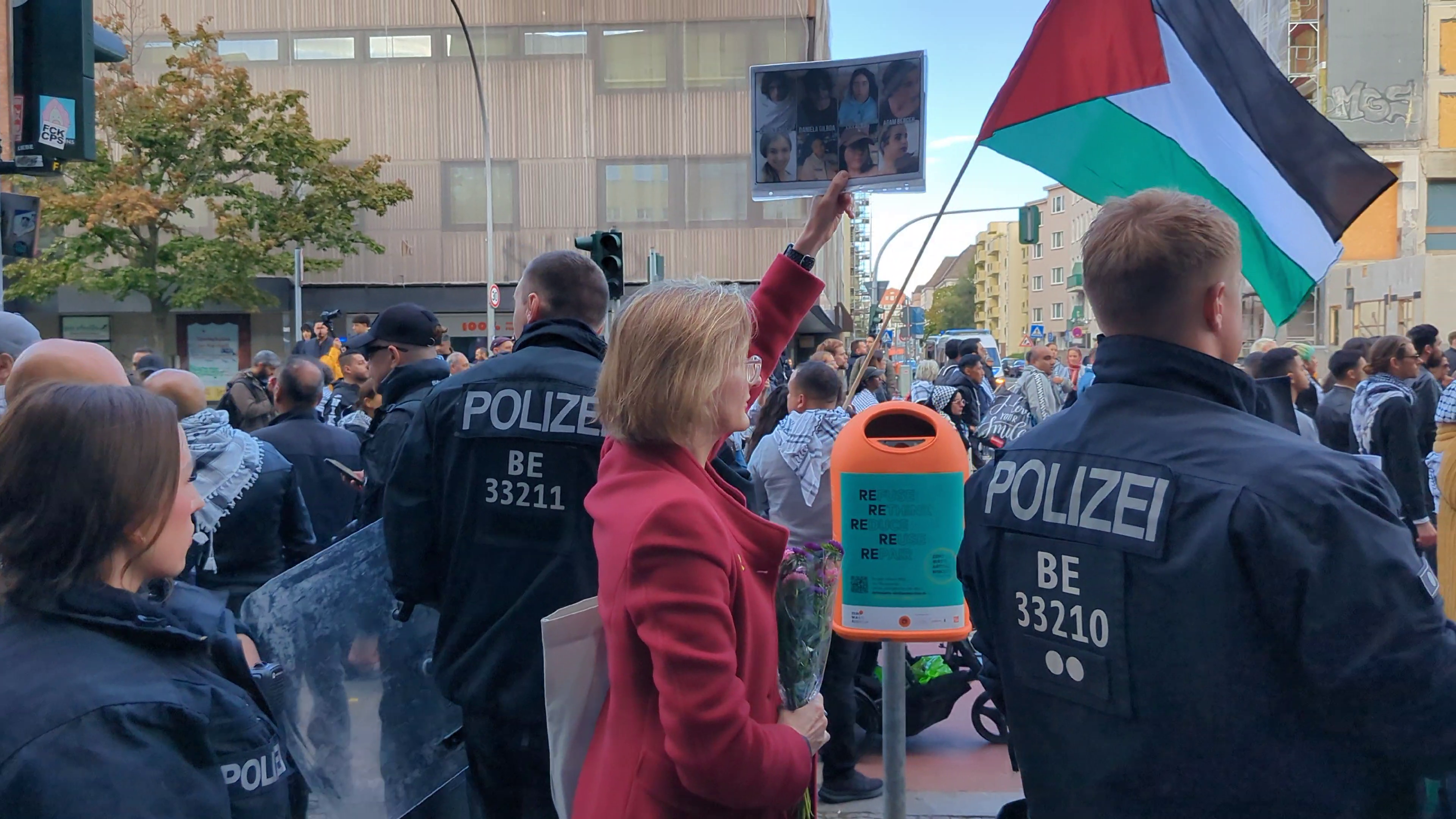
Karoline Preisler demonstrating with sign "Rape is not Resistance" at pro-Palestinian demonstration in Berlin

"Months have passed. Bring the Israeli hostages home. Stop the growing anti-Semitism. Stop the terror against Israel."

At pro-Palestinian demonstrations in Berlin in the aftermath of the October 7 attacks and the ensuing Gaza war, Preisler counter-protested with signs about sexual and gender-based violence during the attack. She regularly displayed a sign reading "Rape is not resistance", "Believe Israeli Women" and photos of the German-Israeli Shani Louk, who was killed during the attack. According to the Tagesspiegel, her 'trademark' at the demonstrations is "bouquets of flowers, cardboard signs and bright coat colors". Preisler decided on this form of protest "a long time ago" following an NPD rally against an asylum shelter. She required police protection at pro-Palestinian protests following physical attacks against her.

During a neo-Nazi march through Berlin-Mitte in February 2025, Preisler stood in front of a neo-Nazi and held up a sign with the slogan "Against Antisemitism", while holding a bouquet of flowers in her other hand. (The newspaper note does not mention it, nor does it make a specific mention)

Preisler was awarded the 2024 Eugen Kogon Prize.

Preisler was kicked and knocked to the ground after a confrontation with a protestor at an anti-Israel protest in Berlin in November 2026.

== Publications ==
- Demokratie aushalten! Über das Streiten in der Empörungsgesellschaft. (Democracy endures! Arguing in a society prone to outrage) Hirzel, Stuttgart, 2021. ISBN 978-3-7776-2944-5

== Personal life ==
Preisler had previously been in a relationship with former Bundestag member Hagen Reinhold.
