= Johan Martin Preisler =

German engraver (1715–1794)

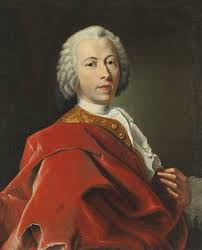
- Portrait of Johan Martin Preisler
- Born: 14 March 1715; Nuremberg
- Died: 17 November 1794 (aged 79); Copenhagen
- Occupation: Engraver
- Employer: Royal Danish Academy of Fine Arts
- Father: Johann Daniel Preissler

Johan Martin Preisler (14 March 1715 in Nuremberg – 17 November 1794 in Copenhagen) was a German engraver, most notable for his work in Denmark where he was professor at the Royal Danish Academy of Fine Arts.

== Biography ==
Johann Martin Preisler was born in Nuremberg on 14 March 1715 to the painter Johann Daniel Preissler and his wife, Anna Felicitas, née Riedner. He came from a dynasty of artists originally from Bohemia. His grandfather was the painter Daniel Preissler, and his siblings were the painters Johann Justin Preissler and Barbara Helena Preissler and the engravers Georg Martin Preisler and Valentin Daniel Preisler. Johan Martin learnt to draw from his father and copper engraving from his older brother Georg Martin.

Preisler's David and Abigail, National Gallery of Denmark, Copenhagen

In 1737, Preisler produced the engraving of David and Abigail, working after a model by his brother Johan Justin that reproduced the original Baroque masterpiece by the Italian painter Guido Reni. This piece gained him recognition in Paris, where the renowned artist Laurent Cars invited him to join his workshop in 1739. There, Preisler worked alongside notable artists such as Georg Friedrich Schmidt and Johann Georg Wille. He engraved several plates after Charles Le Brun for Jean-Baptiste Massé’s major work on Versailles, La Grande Galerie de Versailles, et les deux salons qui l'accompagnent (Paris, 1752–1753). He also realized a portrait of the Cardinal de Bouillon after Hyacinthe Rigaud and a Ganymede (1743) after the French court painter Jean-Baptiste Marie Pierre. Having completed his training, Preisler was preparing to return home to Nuremberg when Count Johann Hartwig Ernst von Bernstorff, the Danish envoy in Paris, offered him a position at the Danish court in Copenhagen. In 1744, Preisler was granted an annual stipend of 300 rigsdaler, and he was appointed court engraver shortly thereafter, in 1745. Although he taught drawing at the Royal Danish Academy of Fine Arts, he did not become a professor until after the Academy relocated to Charlottenborg in 1754.

In 1747–48, Preisler completed his engravings of Christian VI (based on a design by Johann Salomon Wahl), as well as Frederick V and Queen Louise (based on a design by Carl Gustaf Pilo). After the deatg of Odvardt Helmoldt von Lode he completed the engravings for Johann Heinrich Schlegel’s Geschichte der Könige von Dänemark aus dem Oldenburgischen Stamme. Among Preisler’s numerous other engravings from this period one might mention the portraits of Johannes Wiedewelt (after Peder Als), Klopstock (1780, after Jens Juel), Dr. Münter (1775), and a bust portrait of Joachim Wasserschlebe (based on his own drawing). Later works include his Bacchanal (1752), Lot and His Daughters, The Act of Sovereignty (after Wolfgang Heimbach), Jonah in Nineveh (after Salvator Rosa), The Apostle Peter in Prison (after Guido Reni), and Madonna della Seggiola (1784, after Raphael). Preisler also created engravings based on his own drawings, such as The Judgement of King Solomon.

On June 14, 1748, he married Anna Sophie, née Schuckmann (1720–1800), the daughter of a professor at the University of Rostock. He resided at the Royal Danish Academy of Fine Arts at Charlottenborg during the winter, and in the summer at his small house – Gramlille – in Kongens Lyngby, which soon became a gathering place for writers and artists. His children included the engraver Johann Georg Preisler (1757-1831) and the actor and writer Joachim Daniel Preisler (1755-1809), married to the actress Marie Cathrine Preisler (1761-1797). His daughter, Johanne Charlotte Sophie (1754–1833), married the wealthy merchant Johann Ludvig Zinn.

Preisler, who had been appointed Justitsråd (an honorific title) in 1777 and was a member of the Imperial Academy of Fine Arts in Augsburg, died on 17 November 1794, aged nearly 80. He was buried in the Christian's Church, Copenhagen. His portrait, painted by Peder Als in 1764, hangs at the Royal Danish Academy of Fine Arts.

== Gallery ==
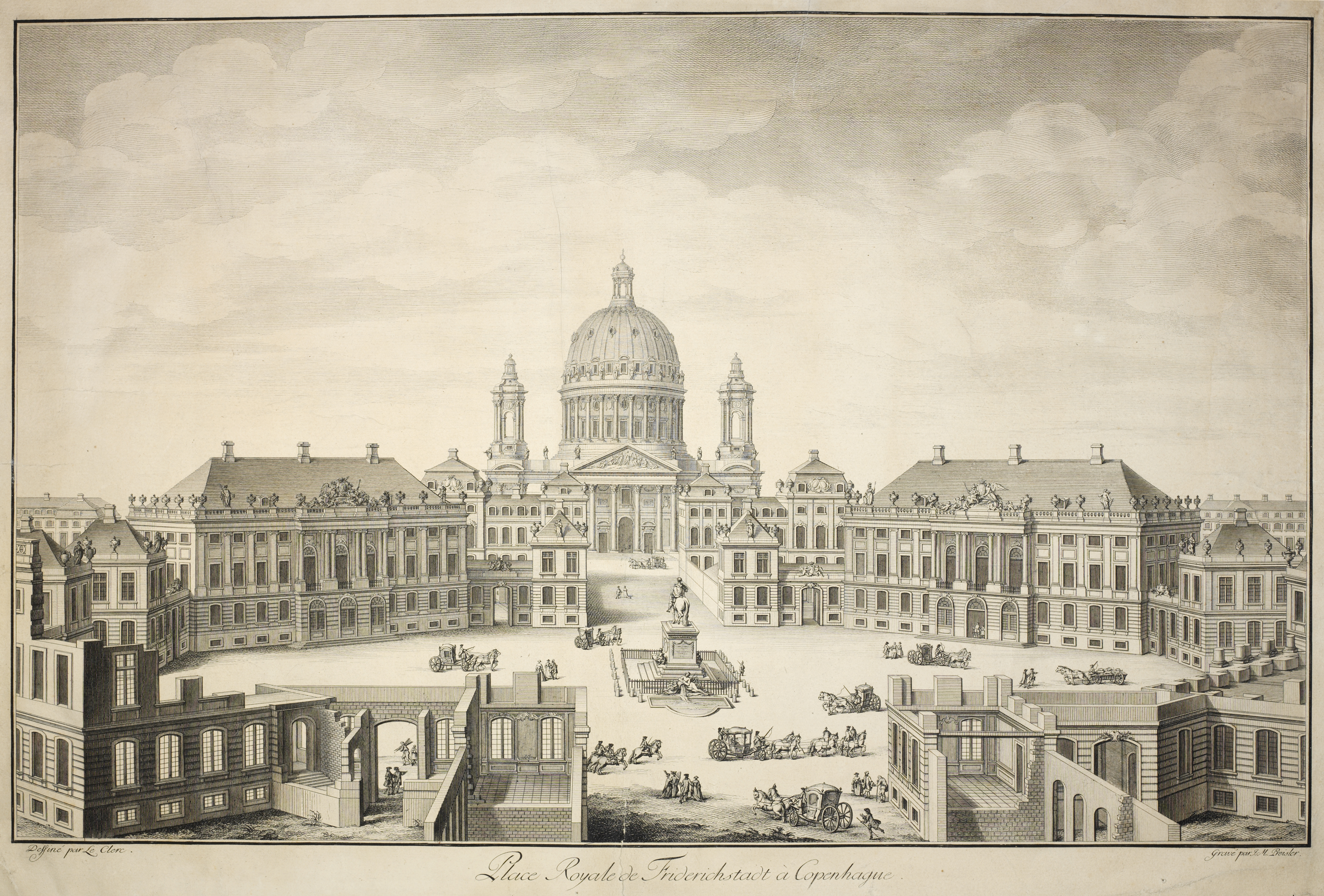
Frederiksstaden, 1766, National Gallery of Denmark

Via Dolorosa, after Paolo Veronese, 1752, National Gallery of Denmark

David's triumphal procession after the fight with Goliath, National Gallery of Denmark

The Angel Appears to Betus, after Guido Reni, 1778, National Gallery of Denmark

Battle scene, 1742, National Gallery of Denmark

Bacchanal, after Jean-Baptiste Marie Pierre, 1751-1752, National Gallery of Denmark
