= Philipp von Stosch =

Prussian antiquarian (1691–1757)

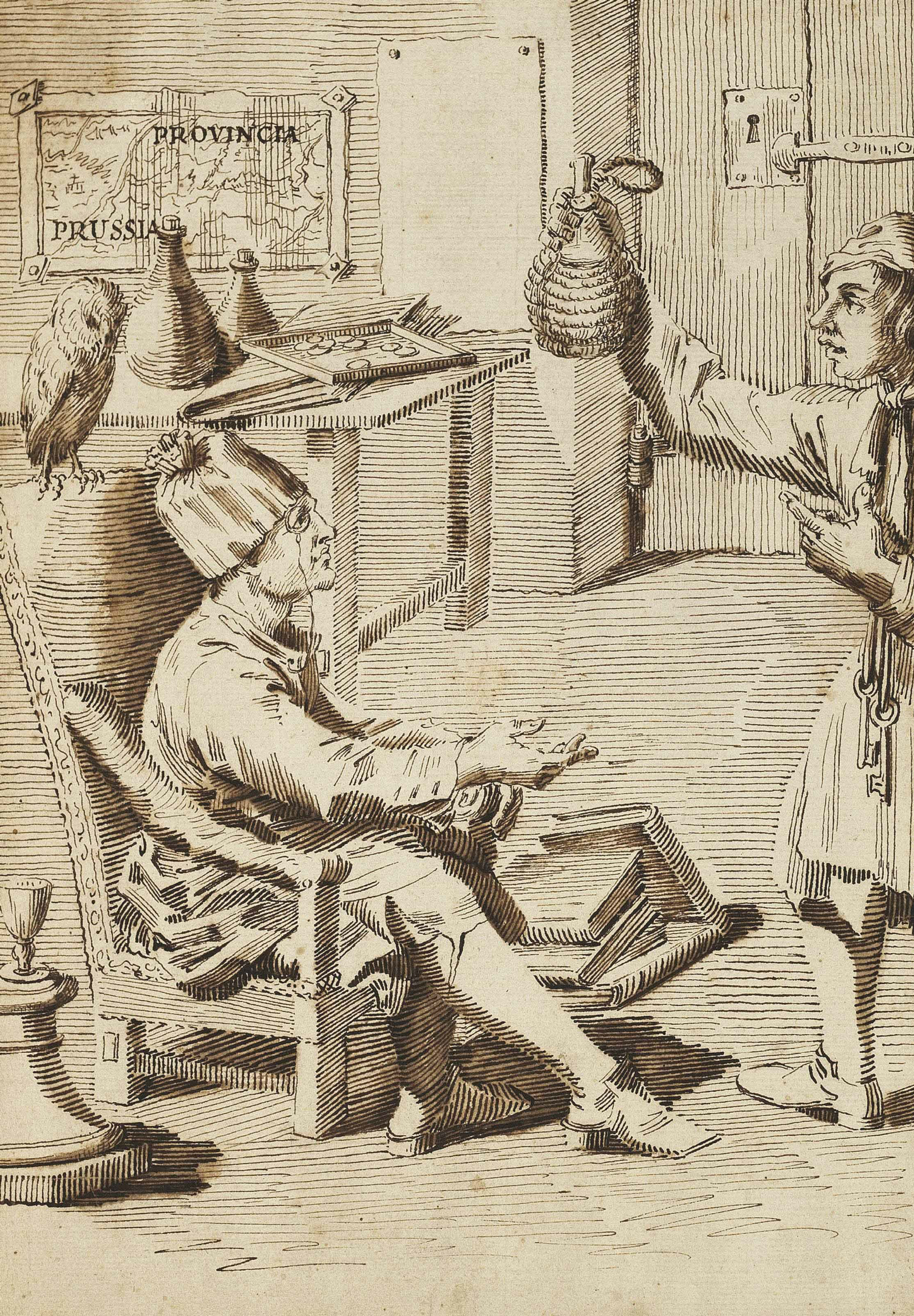
Philipp von Stosch (Pier Leone Ghezzi)

Baron Philipp von Stosch or Philippe de Stosch etc. (22 March 1691 – 7 November 1757) was a Prussian antiquarian who lived in Rome and Florence.

He is mainly remembered for his huge collection of engraved gems, now mostly in Berlin, and his large books on that subject.

== Life ==
Stosch was born in Küstrin (today Kostrzyn in Poland) in the Neumark region of Brandenburg. In 1709, with the blessings of his father, a successful artist who became Mayor (German: Bürgermeister) of Küstrin, Stosch began a tour of Holland, France, and England, which eventually led him to the Papal States. In Rome, a letter of introduction brought him into the circle of Pope Clement XI, a collector and connoisseur of antiquities. Soon he developed a close friendship with the cardinal-nephew, Alessandro Albani. Called home with the death of his elder brother in 1717, Stosch began a series of broader European journeys.

Once again in Rome, Stosch became a dealer in art and antiquities at the center of the antiquarian group that were commissioning excavations in search of works of art. Above all he was a collector of engraved gems of antiquity, books and manuscripts, early engravings and drawings and reputedly a connoisseur of Roman men (reference to his homosexuality). He financed his passions by some unorthodox means, including spying on the Jacobite court in Rome for Sir Robert Walpole's British Government. Stosch was unmasked as a clandestine operative in 1731, and his life was threatened. He was forced to flee the Papal States and took refuge in Florence, under the tolerant rule of Grand Duke Gian Gastone de' Medici. There he settled into a long retirement devoted to connoisseurship, pensioned by the British until he died in 1757. Before long his growing collection required a separate house of its own. (ref. Datenbank Altertumswissenschaften)

Stosch was a founder of a Masonic Lodge in Florence in 1733, that became a direct concern of Rome, leading to the ban on Catholics becoming Freemasons. The first papal ban of Freemasonry, issued by the Florentine-born Pope Clement XII, was not based on any ideological objection to Freemasonry, as is often supposed. In the wake of the 1738 bull Clement's cardinal-nephew Neri Corsini, wrote stressing that Freemasonry in England was merely an innocent amusement; the main objection, according to Corsini, was that the lodge in Florence had become "corrupt". His house became a center for spiritual inquiry of a Rosicrucian, alchemical-panphilosophical nature. The lodge was closed and Tommaso Crudeli was imprisoned.

He encouraged young German artists, not merely those who illustrated his own works but others, like Johann Lorenz Natter (1705-1763), a German gem-engraver and medalist whom Stosch set to copying ancient carved gems in Florence and whose Masonic medal commemorating the Mastership of Charles Sackville, 1733, was engraved and widely distributed (ref. Pelizzi). Versions of it exist in gold and in silver; the Grand Duke apparently got a silver one, now at the Bargello.

Stosch is credited with making the monocle fashionable, but as a connoisseur, Stosch made his lasting impression with a great volume on the subject of Gemmæ Antiquæ Cælatæ (Pierres antiques graveés) (1724), in which Bernard Picart's engravings reproduced seventy antique carved hardstones like onyx, jasper and carnelian from European collections, a volume of inestimable value to antiquarians and historians. It immediately joined the repertory of books of engravings after antiquities of all kinds, which were an essential part of eighteenth century classical studies and informed the Neoclassical styles that got under way shortly after Stosch's death. In English translation by George Ogle it had several editions. At Burton Constable Hall, Yorkshire, the Dining Room overmantel relief executed in the 1760s features Bacchus and Ariadne riding on a panther, modeled on a cameo from the volume. Dozens of other Palladian and Neoclassical uses of the Stosch volume might be instanced.

The baron's own great collection eventually contained over 10,000 cameos, intaglios, and antique glass pastes, the majority of which eventually went to the museums in Berlin. The hardstone carvings among his collections, which rivaled numismatics for their interest to antiquarians, were engraved and entrusted for publication to Winckelmann. Winckelmann's work was underwritten by Baron von Stosch's nephew and heir, Heinrich Wilhelm Muzel, another lifelong bachelor, who had come to stay in Florence with Stosch in 1757 and had been adopted and made Philipp von Stosch's heir (ref. Universitätsbibliothek Trier) .Thus he was looking for prospective purchasers of his uncle's collection just at this moment.

Winckelmann's last letter, penned in the Trieste inn the night he was murdered by a young man he had just picked up, was addressed to Muzel-Stosch. In 1765 King Frederick the Great eventually purchased the greatest part of the collection, for 20 or 30,000 Reichsthaler and an annuity of 400 Reichsthaler (refs. Datenbank Altertumswissenschaften, Universitätsbibliothek Trier); so the engraved gems came to rest in the Berlin museums. Description des Pierres gravées provided subjects for the familiar Neoclassical jasperware medallions in low relief, against green or blue grounds, which were produced in great number by Josiah Wedgwood. Individual figures were re-engraved for Gentleman's Magazine and found their way into Neoclassical marquetry medallions on London-made furniture and other minor decorative arts.

Among other elements in the dispersed collections, the Atlas—of 324 volumes— in which Stosch kept his drawings, among other things the entire cache of drawings left by the Baroque architect Borromini, which Stosch acquired about 1730, before his withdrawal to Florence (ref. Connors), eventually went to Vienna. His considerable library, strong in "history, politics, diplomacy, conclaves, embassies and relazioni from distant parts" (Connors), was purchased in 1759 for the Vatican Library where it is housed with the then recently purchased Ottoboni library (and bear the shelfmarks Ottob.lat. 2565-3100). One of the codices, containing important musical notation, which had belonged to Queen Christina and was given by her to the Vatican Library, was stolen and appeared in Stosch's library, when was then sold to the Vatican in 1759 and thus was returned (ref. Ottoboni Lat. 3025).(Particularly valuable early prints found individual purchasers: Stosch's group of niello prints attributed to Tommaso di Finiguerra were bought by the Leipzig merchant Ernst Peter Otto (1724–99), whose celebrated print collection was dispersed in massive sales in 1851-52.

Some of his medals were acquired by unconventional means. According to an anecdote related by Isaac d'Israeli,

It was in looking over the gems of the royal cabinet of medals, that the keeper perceived the loss of one; his place, his pension, and his reputation were at stake; and he insisted that Baron Stosch should be most minutely examined: in this dilemma, forced to confession, this erudite collector assured the keeper of the royal cabinet, that the strictest search would not avail “Alas, sir! I have it here within,” he said, pointing to his breast. An emetic was suggested by the learned practitioner himself, probably from some former experiment.

In 1764 some of his collections were sold at auction, his architectural drawings, strong in sixteenth century architects, went to enrich the Albertina, Vienna. The Codex Stosch, a bound volume of measured drawings of ancient Roman buildings made by the brother of Antonio da Sangallo the Younger, disappeared after the sale. The codex reappeared in 2005 and was purchased for the RIBA Library, London.

His profile portrait appears on a medal he commissioned from François Marteau in 1727.

His widely circulated letters on antiquarian subjects were reassembled in Carl Justi, Antiquarische Briefe des Baron Philipp von Stosch (1871).

Baron Von Stosch was buried in the Old English Cemetery in Livorno, where his grave, still existing, is badly damaged.
