= Johann Daniel Preissler =

German painter (1666–1737)

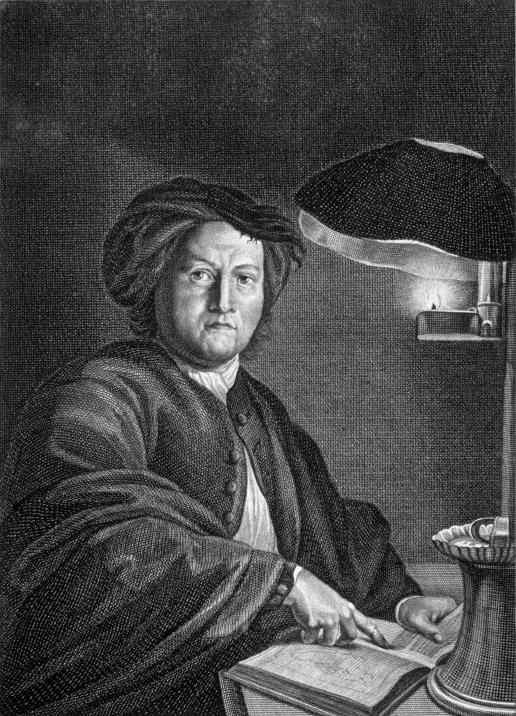
- Born: 1666
- Died: 1737 (aged 70–71)
- Known for: Portraits, nudes, history paintings, art theory
- Notable work: Die durch Theorie erfundene Practic
- Father: Daniel Preissler

Johann Daniel Preissler, or Preisler (1666–1737) was a German painter and director of Nuremberg's Academy of Fine Arts.

He was a notable member of a German artistic family, originating in Bohemia. His children included Johann Justin Preissler (1698–1771), Georg Martin Preisler (1700–1754), Barbara Helena Preisler (1707–1758; married to Oeding), Johan Martin Preisler (1715–1794), and Valentin Daniel Preisler (1717–1765), all in their time renowned artists.

Most notable for his portraits, nudes and history paintings, Johann Daniel Preissler also produced drawings and frescoes. He was particularly known beyond his native Nuremberg for his Die durch Theorie erfundene Practic (full title: Die durch Theorie erfundene Practic oder Gründlich verfasste Reguln deren man sich als einer Anleitung zu berühmter Künstlere Zeichen-Wercke bestens bedienen kann), a sequence of works on art theory – the individual works were translated into several other languages and served as textbooks for students such as the Swiss Salomon Gessner right up until the 19th century. By the time of his death in 1737, Johann Caspar Füssli spoke of Preissler and Jan Kupecky as the two most famous Nuremberg artists of the early 18th century.

== Life ==
Preissler was the posthumous son of the history painter and portraitist Daniel Preissler (1627–1665). He got his education in the studio of Johann Murrer. From 1688 to 1696 he stayed in Italy, including periods in Rome and Venice. In 1705 he became the director of Nuremberg's Academy of Fine Arts which under his leadership turned into a city institution.

In 1716 he founded the Zeichenschule (drawing school), open to "poor people's children" – it proved a great success. With 71 students entering in the first year, its intake was so large that in 1721 Preissler began producing the teaching materials which later became his Die durch Theorie erfundene Practic – he had previously only published academic works, such as ones on anatomy. Preissler also wrote on the academically neglected topics such as ornament and flower-drawing (in 1725) and landscape drawing (1739), though throughout his writing he insisted that these were only beginners' lessons.

According to the Nuernbergisches Gelehrten-Lexicon, he suffered from poor health, which prevented him from achieving all the expectations his great talent allowed. The same article indicates that his five sons were not only excellent artists but fond of music, and to make him happy, they often liked to play a concert for him, in which he occasionally himself participated.

== Bibliography ==
- (de) Nürnberger Künstlerlexikon. 2007
- (de) Wilhelm Schwemmer: Nürnberger Kunst im 18. Jahrhundert.
- (de) Wolf Eiermann: Die Veröffentlichungen der Nürnberger Mahler-Academie.
- (de) Friedrich Leitschuh: Preisler, Daniel [family article] In: Allgemeine Deutsche Biographie (ADB). Band 26. Duncker & Humblot, Leipzig 1888, S. 550–552.
- (de) Will, Georg Andreas, Nürnbergisches Gelehrten-Lexikon, As supplemented by Christian Conrad Nopitsch (8 volumes), published 1755-1802.
