= Barbara Helena Preissler =

German painter

Barbara Helena Preißler, Preissler or Preisler, married Oeding (born 12 June 1707 in Nuremberg and died in 1758 in Braunschweig) was a German miniature painter and copper engraver, as well as creator of objects in ivory, wax and alabaster, and a poet.

== Biography ==
Barbara Helena Preisler was the daughter of the master painter Johann Daniel Preisler in Nürnberg, who also taught her to paint.

In 1729, she married the painter Philipp Wilhelm Oeding (1697-1781), a pupil of her father who later joined the Braunschweig Court of the Duchy of Brunswick-Lüneburg.

She made various copper etchings, mainly topographical views, as well as objects in ivory, wax and alabaster.

As a poet, she was a member of the Pegnesischer Blumenorden (Pegnitz Flower Society or in latin: Societas Florigera ad Pegnesum), a German literary society founded in Nuremberg in 1644 by the poet Georg Philipp Harsdörffer. She adopted the name the Alanturum flower or Elecampane (Alantwurz or Inula helenium).

== Bibliography ==
- Grieb, Manfred, Nürnberger Künstlerlexikon, Munich, 2007, volume 3, page 1171.
- Hamburgisches Künstler-Lexikon, vol. 1 : Die bildenden Künstler 1854, page 181
