= Marie Cathrine Preisler =

Danish stage actress (1761–1797)

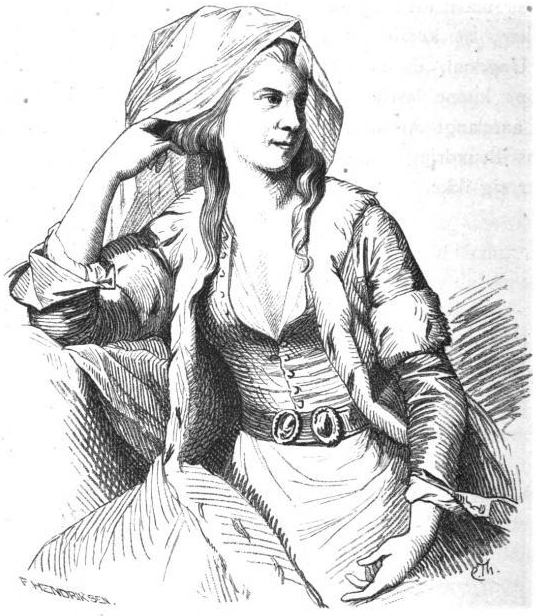
- Occupation: Stage actress
- Years active: 1778-1797

Marie Cathrine Preisler née Devegge (1761–1797) was a Danish stage actress.

She was active at the Royal Danish Theatre in 1778-1797, and a member of the Det Dramatiske Selskab in 1777-1779. She is counted as among the elite of her profession, enjoyed great popularity and was famed for her heroine Soubrette roles.

She married Joachim Daniel Preisler in 1779. This attracted great attention at the time because he was a member of the upper class and moreover joined her profession after their marriage, highly unusual in an age when the stage professions were of low social status. Her spouse became an appreciated actor in lover roles, but the couple made a scandal with their spendthrift: in 1792, her husband fled the country, and four years later, she was placed under guardianship in order to sort out her financial affairs.

== Roles ==
Roles at the Royal Danish Theatre:

=== 1770s ===
- 1778 Crispin sin herres rival Angelique
- 1778 De tre friere Lucilia
- 1778 Deucalion og Pyrrha Pyrrha
- 1778 Don Ranudo de Colibrados Donna Maria
- 1778 Lykken bedre end forstanden Julie
- 1778 Sammensyeren Chloe
- 1778 Ulysses von Ithacia Rosimunda, Helenes søster
- 1778 Zarine Nitocre
- 1779 Celinde Celinde
- 1779 Crispin sin herres rival Angelique
- 1779 Den dobbelte prøve Philaminte, ung enke
- 1779 Den indbildt syge Angelique
- 1779 Forøderen Belise, Cleons gode ven
- 1779 Hekseri Terentia, Leanders fæstemø
- 1779 Jean de France Elsebeth, Jeronimus's datter
- 1779 Raptussen Jenny
- 1779 Rosenbruden i Salency Lucile
- 1779 Uden hoved og hale Kærling
- 1780 Den kærlige kone Baronesse Lucilia
- 1780 Den sansesløse Clarice
- 1780 Den vægelsindede Helene, Erastes søster
- 1780 Husfaderen og stifmoderen Lucretia

=== 1780s ===
- 80 Mændenes skole as Leonore
- 1780 Vildmanden as Frøkenen af Kerkabon
- 1781 Aglae Aglae as * 1781 Den skjønne Arsene Eugenia
- 1781 Bondepigen ved hoffet as Emilie, grevinde
- 1781 De forliebte haandværksfolk as Madame Constance
- 1781 De Forliebtes galenskaber as Agathe
- 1781 Den fornuftige daare as Thrine
- 1781 Den nysgerrige as Mad. Stændler
- 1781 Jeppe paa bjærget Ridefogdens as kone
- 1781 Kongen og forpagteren as Jenny
- 1781 Kærlighed paa prøve as Lucilia, Leonoras kusine
- 1781 Soliman den anden as Roxelane, fransk slavinde
- 1782 Bondepigen ved hoffet as Ninette, bondepige
- 1782 Cecilia as Lisbeth, bondepige
- 1782 De aftakkede officerer as Frøken Goschenborn
- 1782 De fortrædelige hændelser as sConstance
- 1782 De tre friere as Julie
- 1782 Den forstilte tvistighed as Lotte
- 1782 Den gerrige as Elise
- 1782 Den gifte filosof as Celiante
- 1782 Den stolte as Isabelle, Lisimons datter
- 1782 Det standsede bryllup as Julie, ung enke
- 1782 Emilie Galotti as Grevinde Orsina
- 1782 Florentineren as Leonore
- 1782 Henrik og Pernille as Leonore
- 1782 Kolonien as Marine, ung gartnerinde
- 1782 Kun seks retter as Fru Reinhard
- 1782 Landsbypigen as Lise
- 1782 Skovbyggeren as Pauline
- 1782 Soliman den anden as Roxelane, fransk slavinde
- 1782 Turcaret as Baronessen, ung enke
- 1783 Beverley as Henriette, Beverleys søster
- 1783 De aftakkede officerer as Frøken Goschenborn
- 1783 Den straffede gjæk as Fru Clorinville
- 1783 Det uventede møde as Amine, Rezias opvartersker
- 1783 Hververne as Melinde, rig frøken
- 1783 Hyrdinden paa Alperne as Jeanette, bondepige
- 1783 Julie as Cateau
- 1783 Købmanden i Smyrna as Amalie, Dorvals forlovede brud
- 1783 Soldaten som kan hekse as Lisette, Argantes pige
- 1783 Søofficererne as Fru Spencer, Kings søster
- 1783 Søofficererne as Grevinde Worthington
- 1783 Vennen af huset as Agathe
- 1783 Væddeløbet as Grevinde Semange
- 1784 Aglae as Aglae
- 1784 Bagtalelsens skole as Lady Teazle
- 1784 Barberen i Sevilla as Rosine, Bartholos myndling
- 1784 Barselstuen as Kone
- 1784 Bødkeren as Trine
- 1784 De samnitiske ægteskaber as Eliane
- 1784 De to venner as Pauline
- 1784 De uventede tilfælde as Lisette, Emilies pige
- 1784 Den indbildt as syge Angelique
- 1784 Den kærlige forbitrelse as Ascanius
- 1784 Det foregivne hekseri as Sigøjner
- 1784 Søhavnen as Sangerinde
- 1784 Ægteskabsdjævelen as Fru Glosing
- 1785 Anton og Antonnette as Antonnette
- 1785 Bagtalelsens skole as Lady Teazle
- 1785 Barberen i Sevilla as Rosine, Bartolos myndling
- 1785 Datum in blanco as Leonore
- 1785 De nysgerrige mandfolk as Fru Lisidor
- 1785 De nysgerrige mandfolk as Fru Monreal
- 1785 Den foregivne Lord as Finette
- 1785 Den politiske kandestøber as Mad. Abrahams
- 1785 Det foregivne hekseri as Sigøjner
- 1785 Fejltagelserne as Frøken Trine
- 1785 Gorm den gamle as Gunild,
- 1785 Juliane von Lindorak as Henriette von Lindorak
- 1785 Kærlighed uden strømper as Grethe, Johans forlovede
- 1785 Købmanden i Smyrna as Amalie, Dorvals forlovede brud
- 1786 Aglae as Aglae
- 1786 Den løgnagtige tjener as Melisse
- 1786 Figaros giftermaal as Suzanne, grevindens kammerpige
- 1786 Italienerinden i London as Celinde
- 1786 Orfevs og Evrydice as Hersilia
- 1786 Vestindianeren as Charlotte Rusport
- 1787 Ariadne paa Naxos as Ariadne
- 1787 Bagtalelsens skole as Lady Teazle
- 1787 Balders død as Nanna
- 1787 Barberen i Sevilla as Rosine, Bartholos myndling
- 1787 Barselstuen as Stine Isenkræmmers / Kone
- 1787 Bødkeren as Trine
- 1787 Claudina af Villa as Bella Donna Claudina
- 1787 De aftakkede officerer as Frøken Goschenborn
- 1787 Den bogstavelige udtydning as Jenny
- 1787 Fiskerne as Birthe
- 1787 Kvaternen as Lise
- 1787 Raptussen as Jenny
- 1787 Søofficererne as Fru Spencer, Kings søster
- 1788 Bagtalelsens skole as Lady Teazle
- 1788 Barberen i Sevilla as Rosine, Bartholos myndling
- 1788 Barselstuen as Kone
- 1788 Bussemanden as Frøken Munterholm
- 1788 Den politiske kandestøber as Mad. Abrahams
- 1788 Det foregivne hekseri as Sigøjner
- 1788 Forvandlingerne as Marie, en forklædt bondepige
- 1788 Heckingborn as Miss Harriet, Datons søster
- 1788 Jægerne as Frederikke
- 1788 Kærlighed uden strømper as Grethe, Johans forlovede
- 1788 Ulysses von Ithacia as Rosimunda, Helenes søster
- 1788 Ægteskabsdjævelen as Fru Glosing
- 1789 Apothekeren og doktoren as Rosalia
- 1789 Ariadne paa Naxos as Ariadne
- 1789 Bagtalelsens skole as Lady Teazle
- 1789 Den gerrige as Elise
- 1789 Den skinsyge kone Mistress as Oakly
- 1789 Den skjønne Arsene as Arsene
- 1789 Greven af Olsbach as Julie, grevens søster
- 1789 Henrik og Pernille as Leonore
- 1789 Ringen as Baronesse von Schønhelm
- 1790 Ariadne paa Naxos as Ariadne

=== 1790s ===
- 1790 Athalia as Athalia, dronning
- 1790 Damon og Pythias as Thesta, hans søster
- 1790 Datum in blanco as Leonore
- 1790 De aftakkede officerer as Frøken Goschenborn
- 1790 Den indbildt syge as Angelique
- 1790 Frode og Fingal as Ulvilda, Kong Frodes søster
- 1790 Julie as Grevinde
- 1790 Kun seks retter as Fru Reinhard
- 1790 Medea as Medea
- 1790 Menneskehad og anger as Grevinde
- 1790 Mændenes skole as Leonore
- 1790 Selim og Mirza as Ung marrokaner
- 1790 Søofficererne as Grevinde Worthington
- 1791 Ariadne paa Naxos as Ariadne
- 1791 Bagtalelsens skole as Lady Teazle
- 1791 Balders død as Nanna
- 1791 Den naturlige søn as Fru Paragon
- 1791 Raptussen as Jenny
- 1791 Skuespillerskolen as Frøken von Lemmel
- 1791 Syngesygen as Lisette
- 1792 Arven i Marseille as Madame Saintonge
- 1792 Bagtalelsens skole as Lady Teazle
- 1792 Barberen i Sevilla as Rosine, Bartholos myndling
- 1792 Barselstuen as Kone
- 1792 Bortførelsen as Vilhelmine von Sachau
- 1792 De vonner og vanner as Frøken von Sommer
- 1792 Den sorte mand as Mistress Johnson
- 1792 Feen Ursel as Generaladvokat
- 1792 Kinafarerne as Birgitte, kælderpige
- 1792 Ringen as Majorinde
- 1792 Stregen i regningen as Charlotte
- 1793 Bagtalelsens skole as Lady Teazle
- 1793 Barberen i Sevilla as Rosine, Bartholos myndling
- 1793 Barselstuen as Kone
- 1793 De to hatte as Fru von Mørbak
- 1793 Den mistænkelige mand as Clarinde
- 1793 Den aabne brevveksling as Sophie
- 1793 Ja eller Nej as Julie
- 1793 Ulysses von Ithacia as Rosimunda, Helenes søster
- 1794 Han blander sig i alt as Eveline
- 1794 Hekseri as Frue
- 1794 Kun seks retter as Fru von Schmerling
- 1794 Myndlingernes skole as Julie
- 1794 Vejen til ødelæggelse as Fru Warren
- 1795 Bagtalelsens skole as Lady Teazle
- 1795 Bryllupshøjtiden as Generalinde Reichenau
- 1795 De aftakkede officerer as Frøken Goschenborn
- 1795 De fire Formyndere as Betty
- 1795 De nysgerrige fruentimmere as Leonore
- 1795 Den værdige kone as Frøken Rauning
- 1796 Ariadne paa Naxos as Ariadne
- 1796 Bortførelsen as Vilhelmine von Sachau
- 1796 Bryllupshøjtiden as Generalinde Reichenau
- 1796 De snorrige fættere as Fru Dormin, enke
- 1796 Den lykkelige familie as Lovise
- 1796 Den aabne brevveksling as Sophie
- 1796 Dormon og Wilhelmine as Fru Krumdorf, officersfrue
- 1796 Dyveke as Sigbrit
- 1796 Rejsen til byen as Fru Reising
- 1796 Søofficererne as Fru Spencer, Kings søster
- 1797 Barselstuen as Dame
- 1797 De forliebte haandværksfolk as Madame Constance
- 1797 Han blander sig i alt asEveline
- 1797 Stregen i regningen as Charlotte
