= Johann Salomon Wahl =

German painter (1689–1765)

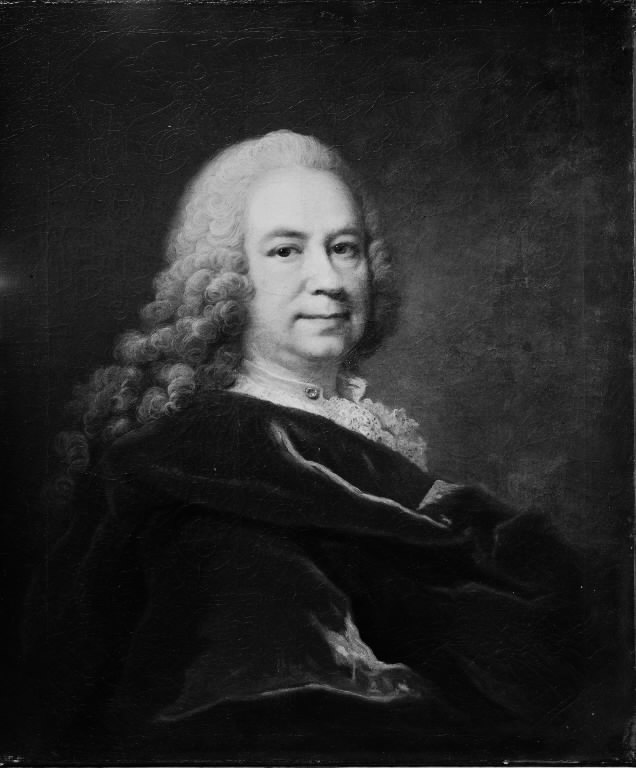
Self-portrait, Statens Museum for Kunst, 1755

Johann Salomon Wahl (1689, Chemnitz, Electorate of Saxony – 5 December 1765, Copenhagen) was a German artist who became a court painter in Denmark.

== Biography ==
He trained as a painter between 1705 and 1711 with David Hoyer (1667–1720), the court painter in Leipzig. After that, he settled in Hamburg, where he worked as a portrait painter for the Holstein. In 1719, he was called to Denmark to work for the Danish royal family.

When Christian VI ascended the throne in 1730, Wahl was appointed as court painter. In 1737, he took over the administration of the Royal Collection. In 1744, he became an honorary member of the Accademia di Belle Arti di Firenze.

He was among the first Northern artists to apply the new French styles of portrait painting, emphasizing one's position in society rather than their personality, although his portraits of those outside the nobility tended to be freer in style.
