= Daniel Preissler =

German painter (1627–1665)

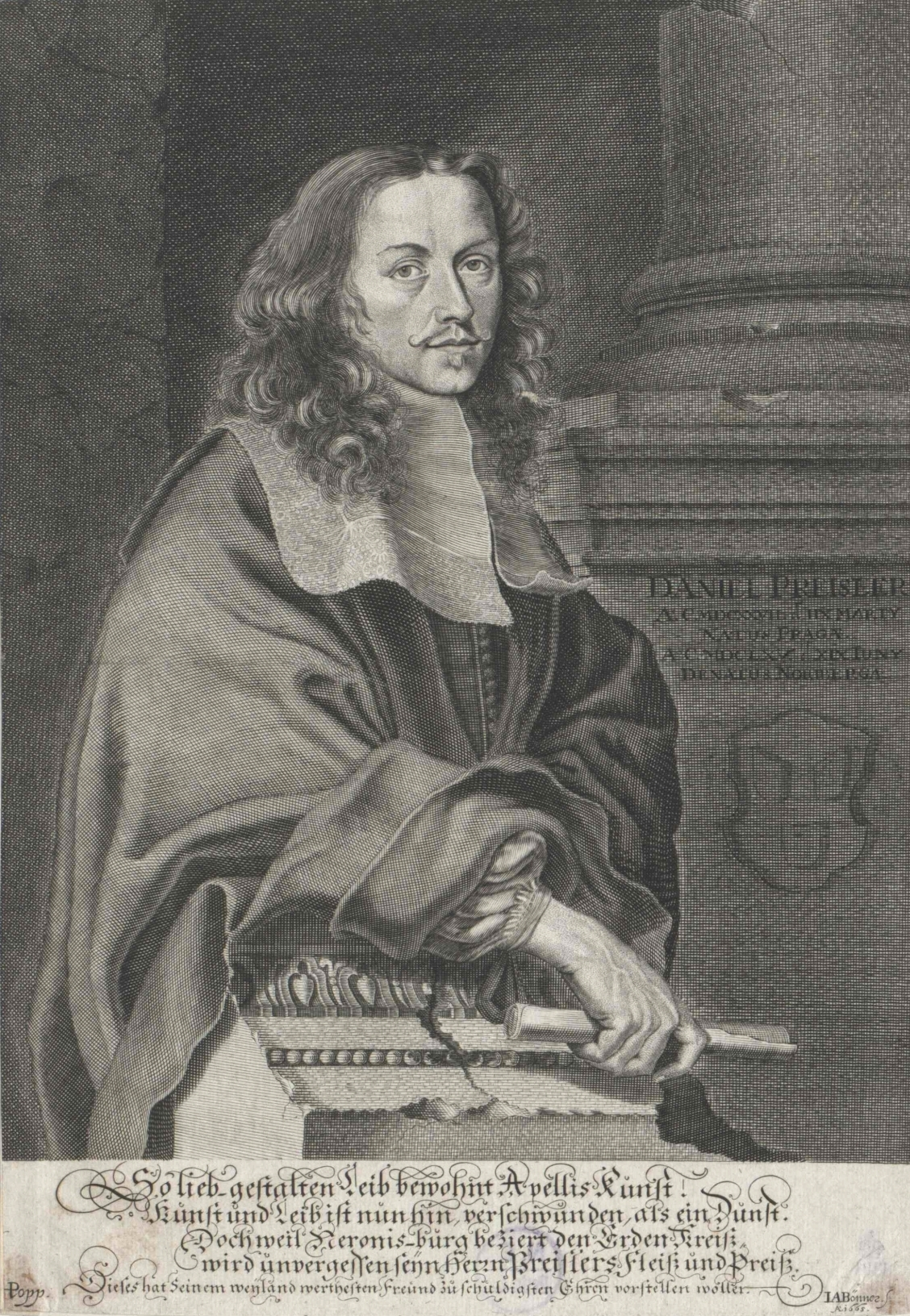
- Portrait of Daniel Preissler by Johann Alexander Böner
- Born: March 8, 1627; Prague
- Died: June 19, 1665 (aged 38); Nuremberg
- Children: 3, including Johann Daniel Preissler

Daniel Preissler (or Preisler, 8 March 1627 – 19 June 1665) was a German painter, originating from Bohemia.

== Biography ==
Preissler was born in Prague. He was the son of the locksmith Georg Preisler and descended from an old renowned family of master glassmakers from Bohemia.

In 1642, he started his apprenticeship with Dresden Court painter Christian Schiebling. He then wandered through Germany and Austria and finally settled down in Nuremberg in 1652. In 1658, he painted the two panels of the great organs of the St. Sebaldus Church in Nuremberg (destroyed by bombings on 2 January 1945), on which he depicted the main musicians, academics and clerics of the city.

In 1660, he painted the Mission of the Holy Spirit for the Heilig-Geist-Spital in Nuremberg. Daniel Preissler left a number of expressive portraits of among others Justina Katharina Kirchmayr (around 1660) as well as a self-portrait playing the lute, together with his wife and three children, dated 1665, the year of his premature death, at 38 years old, in Nuremberg. These works can be seen in the Germanisches Nationalmuseum in Nuremberg.

Preissler's son, Johann Daniel Preissler, born posthumously, followed in his father's footsteps and became an important painter in Nuremberg, and his five grandchildren were also painters.

== Bibliography ==
- (de) Leitschuh, Franz Friedrich, « Preisler, Daniel » in: Allgemeine Deutsche Biographie, tome 26, Leipzig : Duncker & Humblot, 1888, p. 550.
- (de) Bosl, Karl, Bayerische Biographie, Regensburg, 1983 ISBN 3-7917-0792-2, p. 600.
- (de) Sturm, « Originalaufzeichnungen zur Geschichte der Preisler'schen Künstlerfamilie », in: Archiv für die zeichnenden Künste, vol. 9, 1863, p. 363-391.
- (de) Lutze, Eberhard, « Zwei unbekannte Bildnisse von Daniel Preisler ». In: Kunst- und Antiquitätenrundschau, vol. 42, 1934, pp. 336–339.
- (de) Röttgen, Herwarth, « Ein barockes Bild von Vergänglichkeit und Hoffnung. Zum Selbstbildnis Daniel Preislers mit seiner Familie », In: Das Münster, vol. 15, 1962, pp. 48–49.
- (de) Schuster, Peter-Klaus, Theodor Fontane, Effi Briest - Ein Leben nach christlichen Bildern, Tübingen 1978, pp. 53.
- (de) Tacke, Andreas, Die Gemälde des 17. Jahrhundreds im Germanischen Nationalmuseum.
- (de) Bestandskatalog, Mainz, 1995, pp. 181–182, N°87.
- (de) G. Ulrich Grossman (dir.), « Von teutscher Not zu höfischer Pracht 1648-1701 », Ausst. Germanisches Nationalmuseum, Nuremberg, 1998, N° 80, p. 128-130.
- (de) Hess, Daniel, Eitelkeit und Selbsterkenntnis. Selbstbildnisse des 17. und 18. Jahrhunderts aus dem Germanischen Nationalmuseum, Nuremberg, 1999, N° 13.
- (de) Hess, Daniel and Hirschfelder, Dagmar (Ed.), "Renaissance, Barock, Aufklärung, Kunst und Kultur vom 16. bis zum 18. Jahrhundert", Die Schausammlungen des Germanischen Nationalmuseums, vol. 3, Nuremberg, 2010, p. 209-210, 408.
- (de) Will, Georg Andreas, Nürnbergisches Gelehrten-Lexikon, As supplemented by Christian Conrad Nopitsch (8 volumes), published 1755-1802.
