= Valentin Daniel Preisler =

German engraver (1717–1765)

Valentin Preisler
- Der Gute Alchimyst, mezzotint on cream laid paper, 45.4 cm x 34 cm, Yale Center for British Art
- Born: 18 April 1717; Nuremberg, Holy Roman Empire
- Died: 8 April 1765 (aged 47); Nuremberg, Holy Roman Empire
- Parent: Johann Preisler

Valentin Daniel Preisler or Preissler (18 April 1717 – 8 April 1765) was a German engraver.

== Biography ==
Valentin Daniel Preisler was the youngest son of the painter Johann Daniel Preisler and his wife Felicitas Riedner (deceased in 1743). He became a pupil of Bernhard Vogel, and later, for two years, of his brother Johan Martin Preisler in Copenhagen. After the death of Vogel, he finished the engraved edition of the paintings of Jan Kupecký, initially started by Vogel, and published in Nuremberg in 1745. He was a refined artist who left many works. He is among others remembered for his portraits of famous composers such as Georg Philipp Telemann, Carl Heinrich Graun, Johan Agrell and Ignazio Fiorillo. Valentin Daniel Preisler was married to Anna Sophie Volland.

== Bibliography ==
- (de) Leitschuh, Franz Friedrich, « Preisler, Valentin Daniel », in: Allgemeine Deutsche Biographie, tome 26, Leipzig : Duncker & Humblot, 1888, page 551 et suiv.
- (de) Bosl, Karl, Bayerische Biografie, Regensburg, 1983, page 601.
- (de) Preisler, Bertel, Slægten Preisler, 1984.
- (de) Will, Georg Andreas, Nürnbergisches Gelehrten-Lexikon, As supplemented by Christian Conrad Nopitsch (8 volumes), published 1755-1802.
