= Georg Martin Preisler =

German engraver

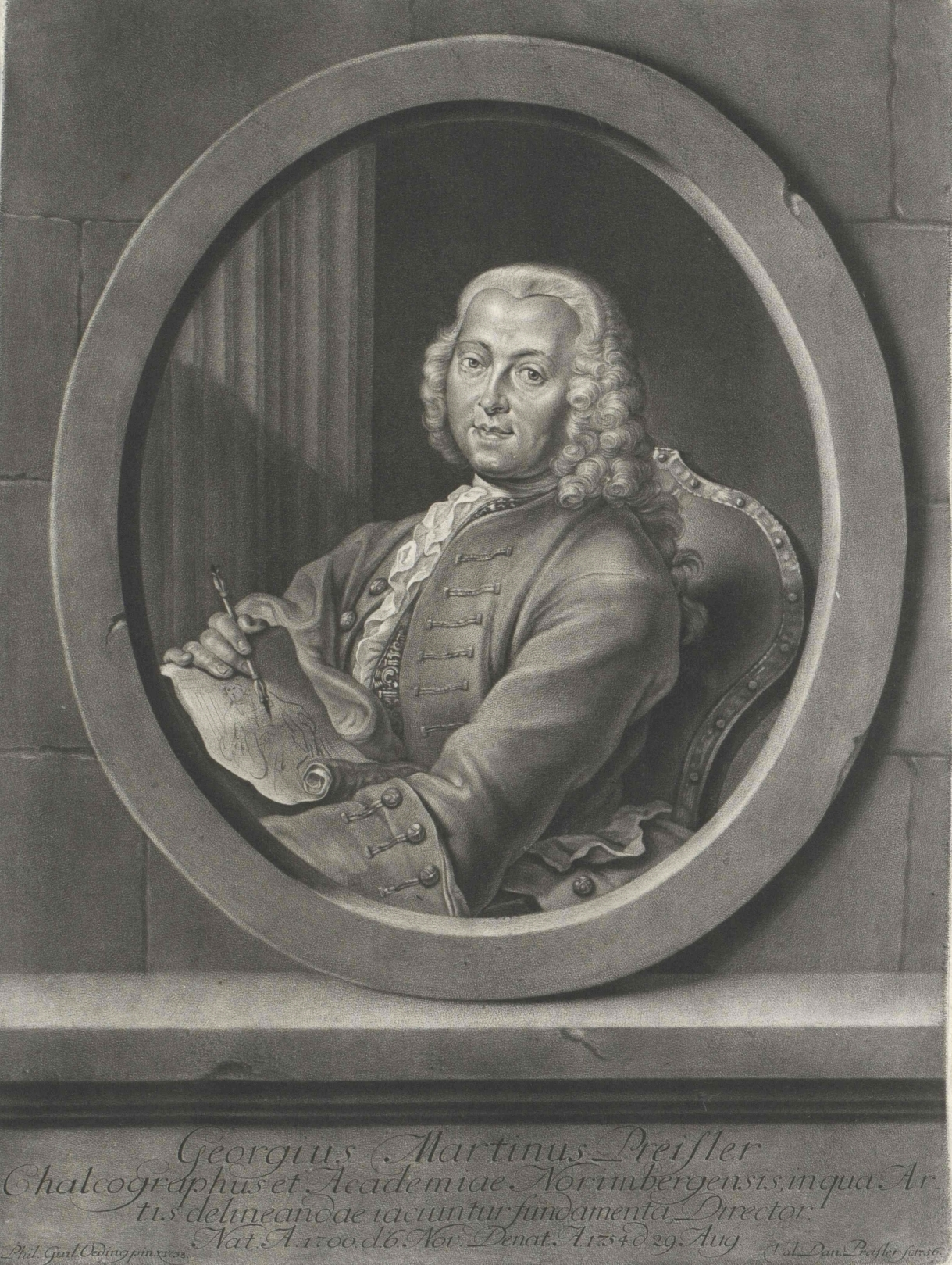
Portrait of Georg Martin Preisler by Valentin Daniel Preisler (1756)

Georg Martin Preisler (1700–1754) was a German engraver. Born in Nuremberg, he was the son of Johann Daniel Preisler. He was most notable for his portraits and a series of twenty-one engravings of classical and neo-classical sculptures in Rome, based on drawings made there by his brother Johan Martin Preisler.
