= Mietraching =

Mietraching may refer to:

- Deggendorf-Mietraching, Bavaria
- Bad Aibling-Mietraching, Bavaria
