= Ludwigsbad =

Former spa hotel in Bad Aibling, Germany

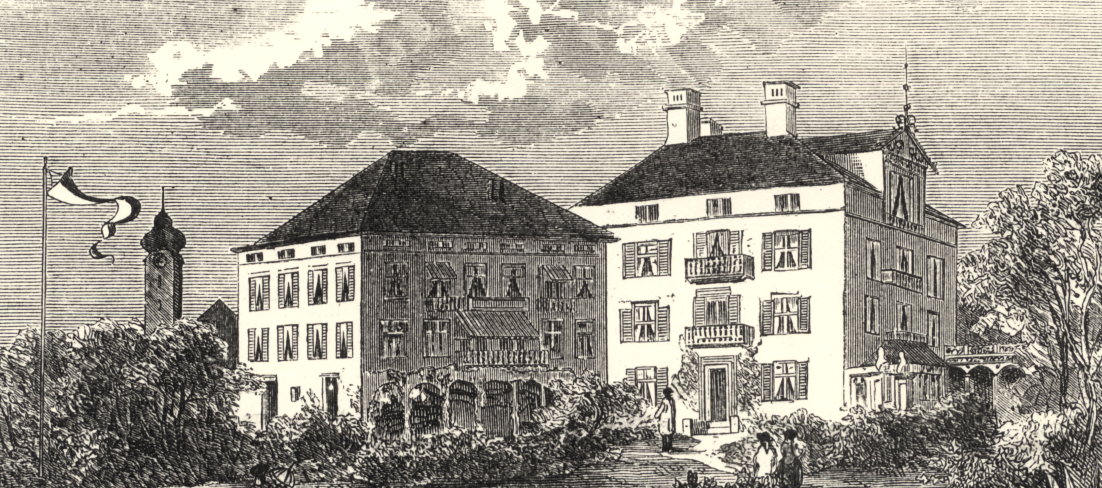
The Ludwigsbad in the 19th century (wood engraving after Max Kuhn, about 1870)

The former spa hotel Ludwigsbad in Bad Aibling was Bavaria’s first peat pulp spa and the world’s first saline peat pulp health resort. Its origins date back to a "Soolen- und Moorschlamm-Badeanstalt" founded by the royal Bavarian court physician Desiderius Beck in 1845.

== History ==
=== 19th century ===
In the middle of the 19th century, the spa was the centre of Bad Aibling's health resort business. Despite this, it got into economic difficulties, which were solved when the spa was taken over by the entrepreneur Karl von Berüff.

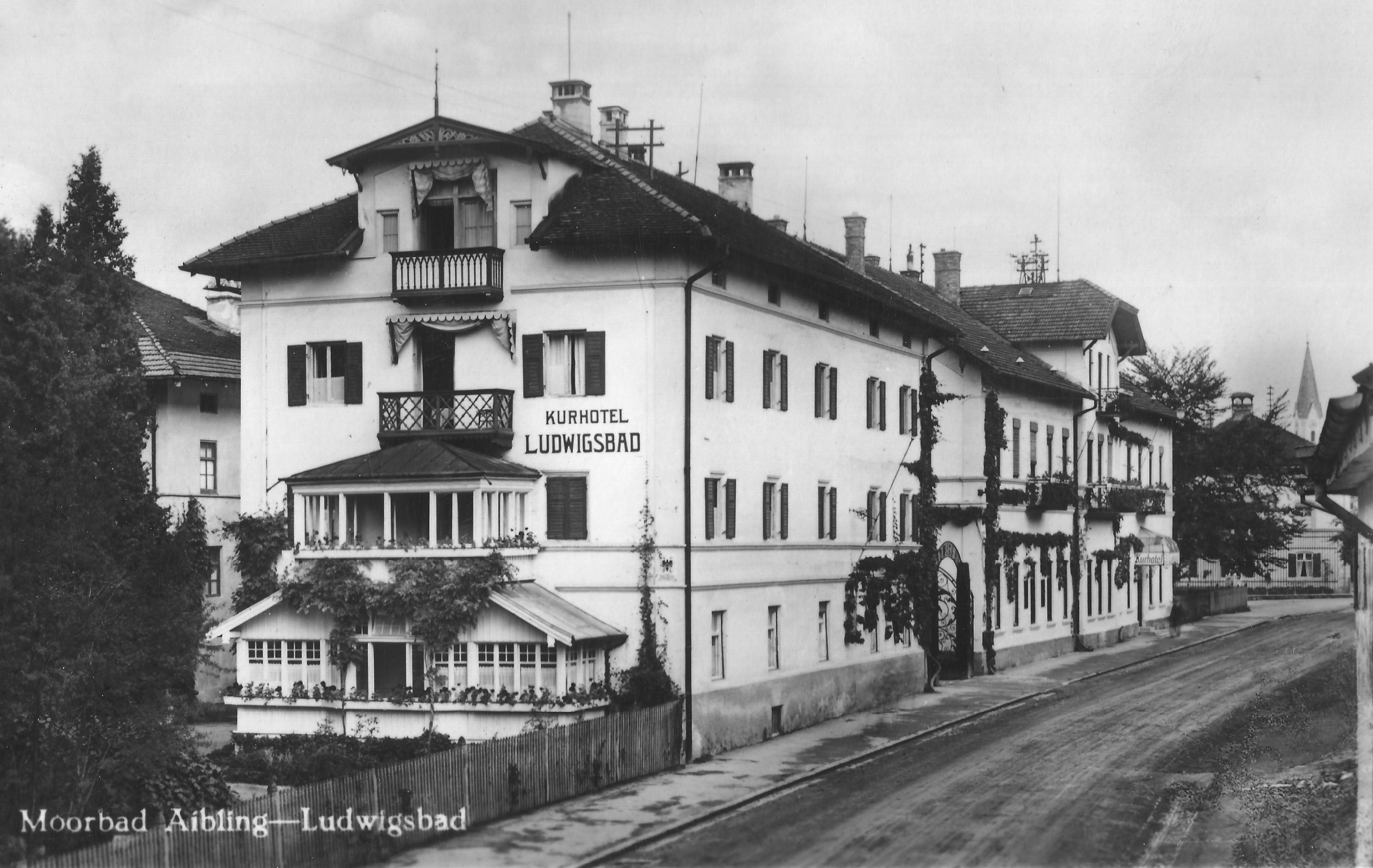
External view of the Ludwigsbad ca. 1900

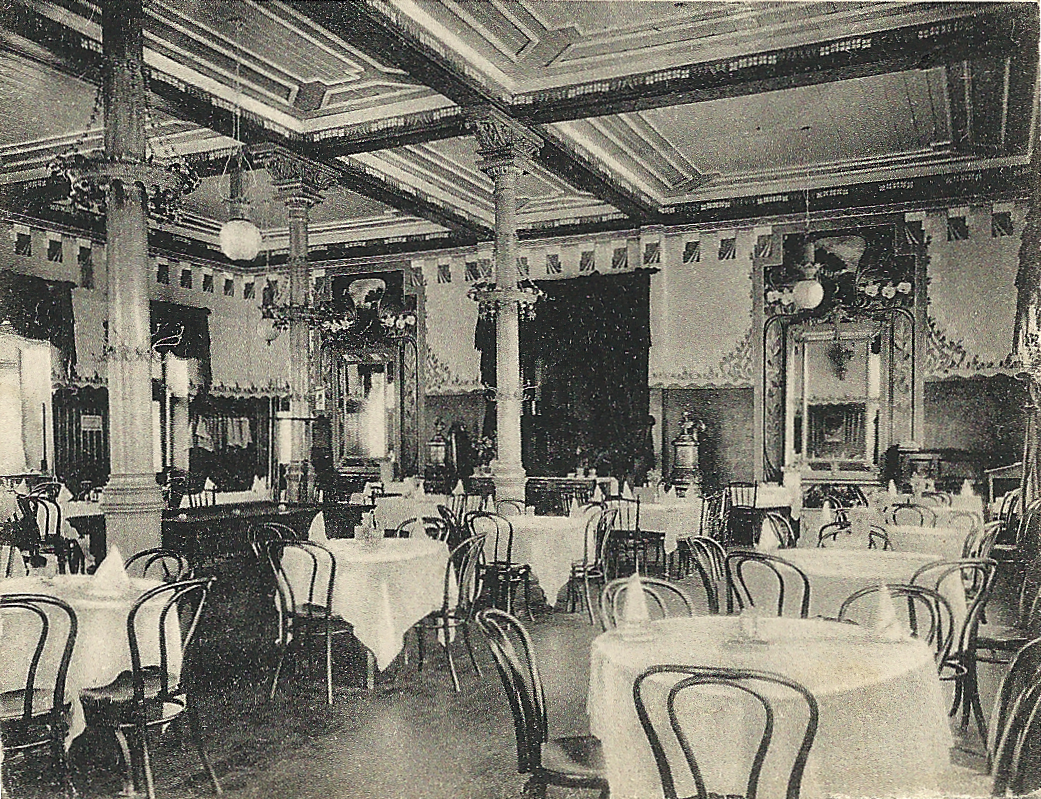
Dining room about 1900

=== 20th century ===
After the owner's family had contracted debts and made default in payments, the Ludwigsbad had to be put up for compulsory sale in 1902. The entrepreneur and financier Ludwig Meggendorfer acquired the long-standing estate. Extensive reconstruction introduced a then very advanced equipment including a steam heating system, electrical light baths, hydro-electric baths and shower rooms. Under the control of the engineer von Hößle a modern spa house was erected, which featured an automatic peat pulp conditioning plant. This installation according to the "Meggendorfer-System" was able to optimise both the consistency of the mud and to disinfect it.

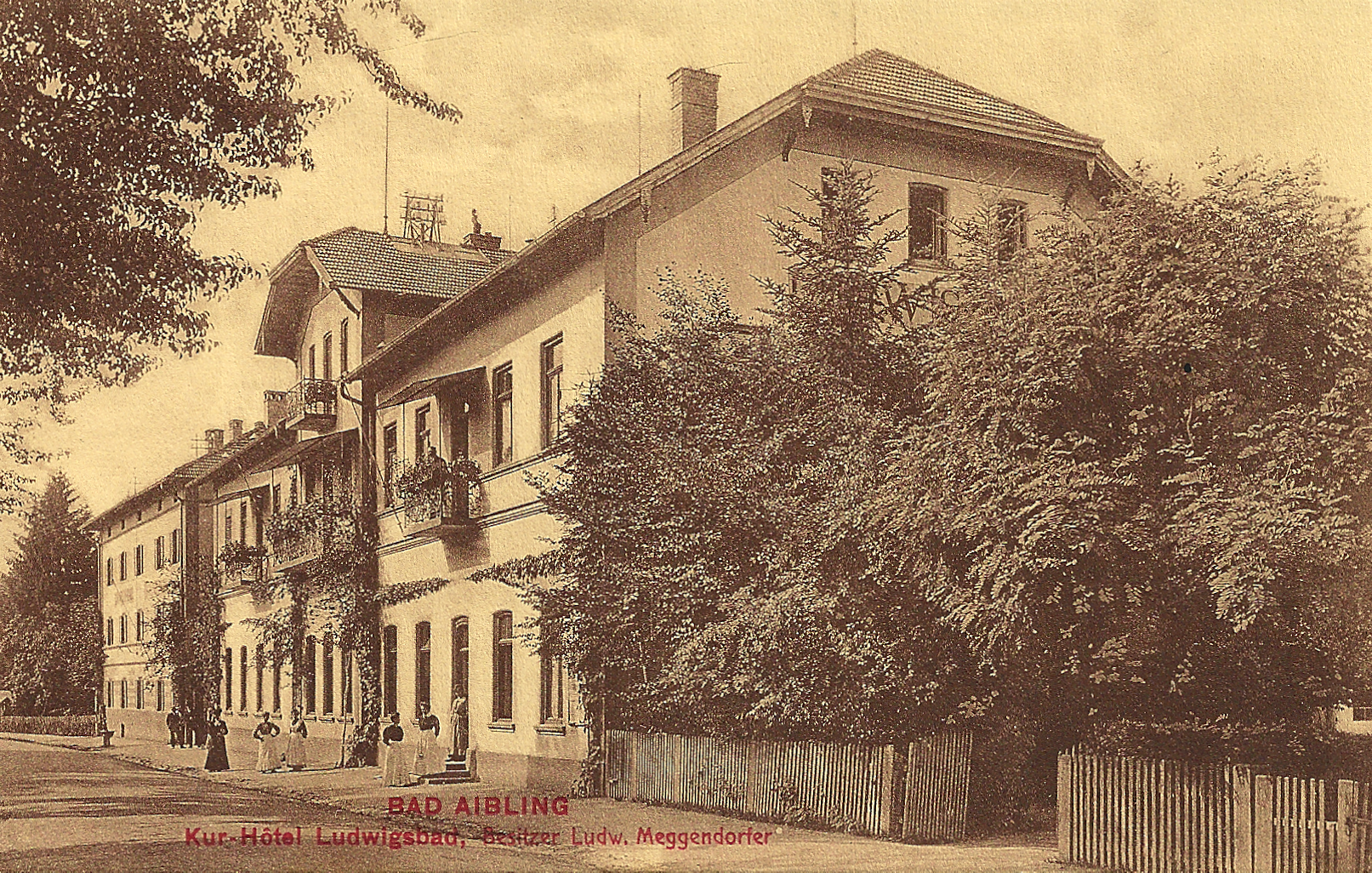
External view, ca. 1905

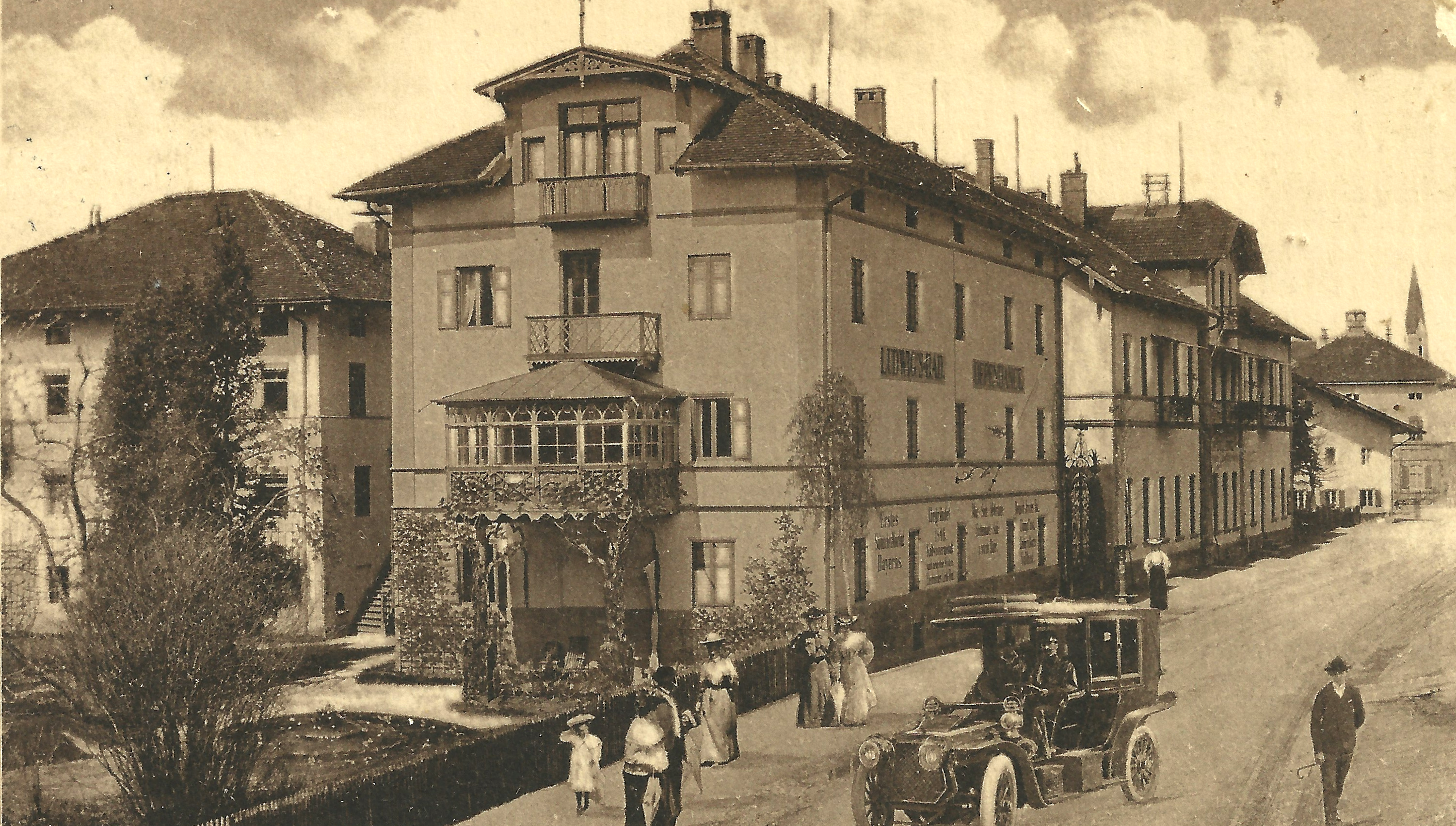
Northern buildings, ca. 1910

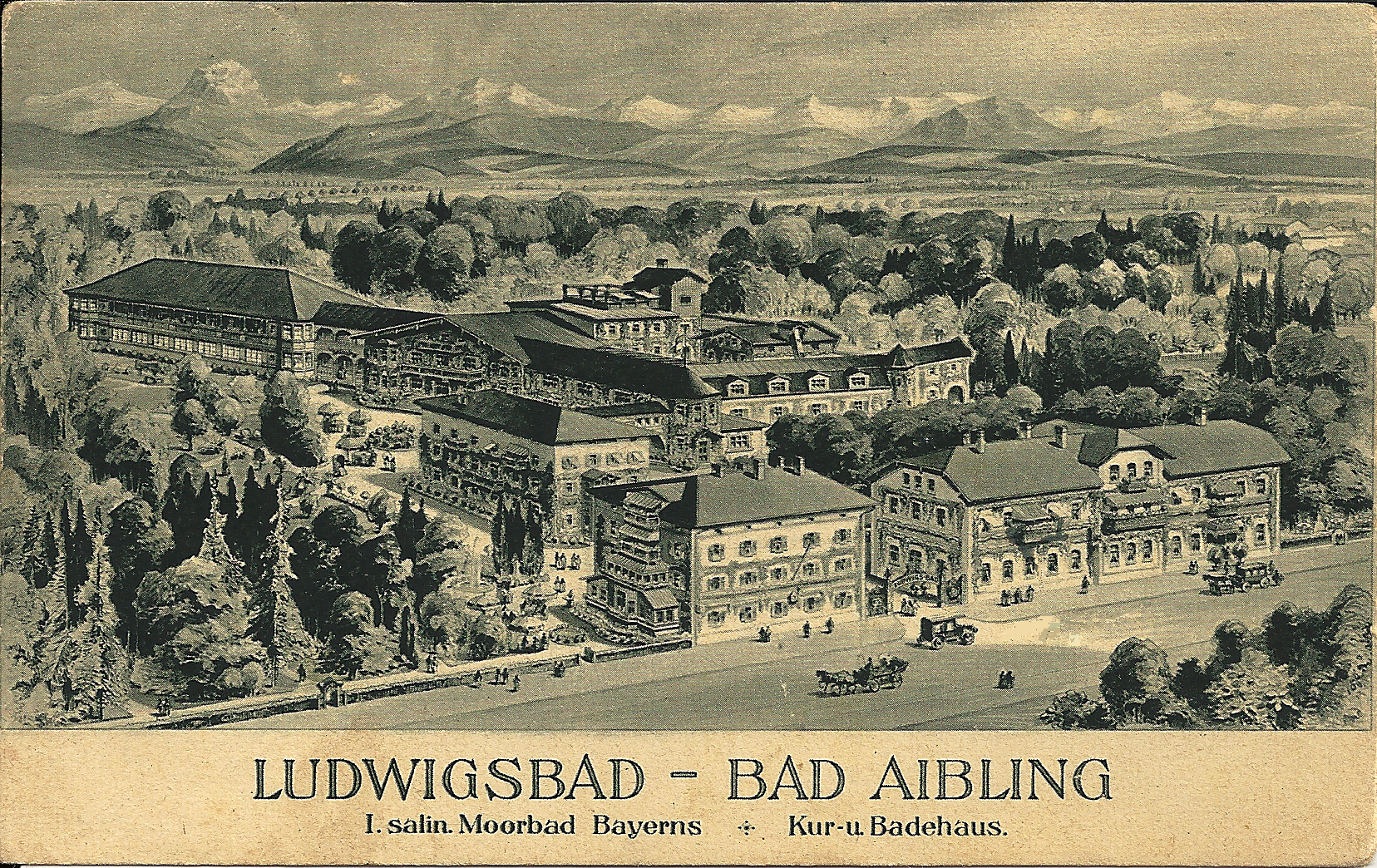
Total view of the Ludwigsbad installations, ca. 1918

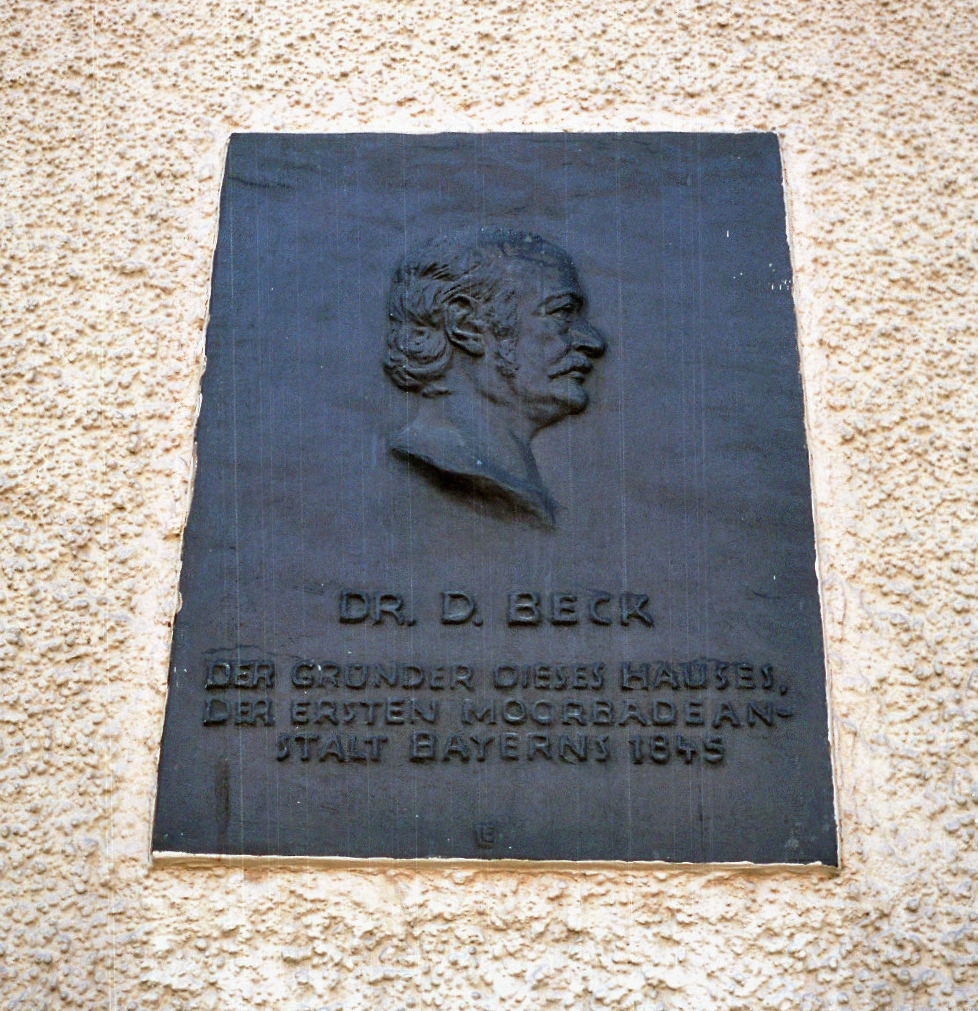
Memorial plaque for Dr. Desiderius Beck at the former hotel's northern wall

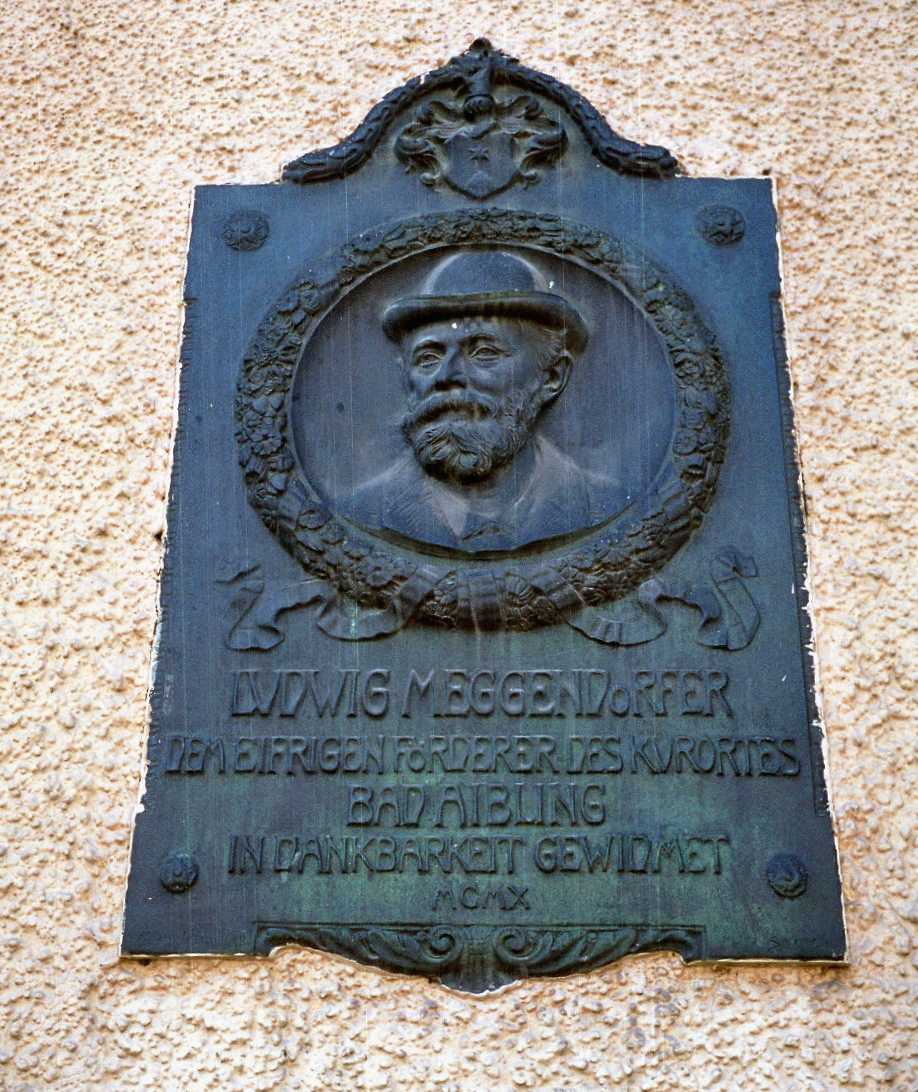
Memorial plaque for Ludwig Meggendorfer

=== 21st century ===
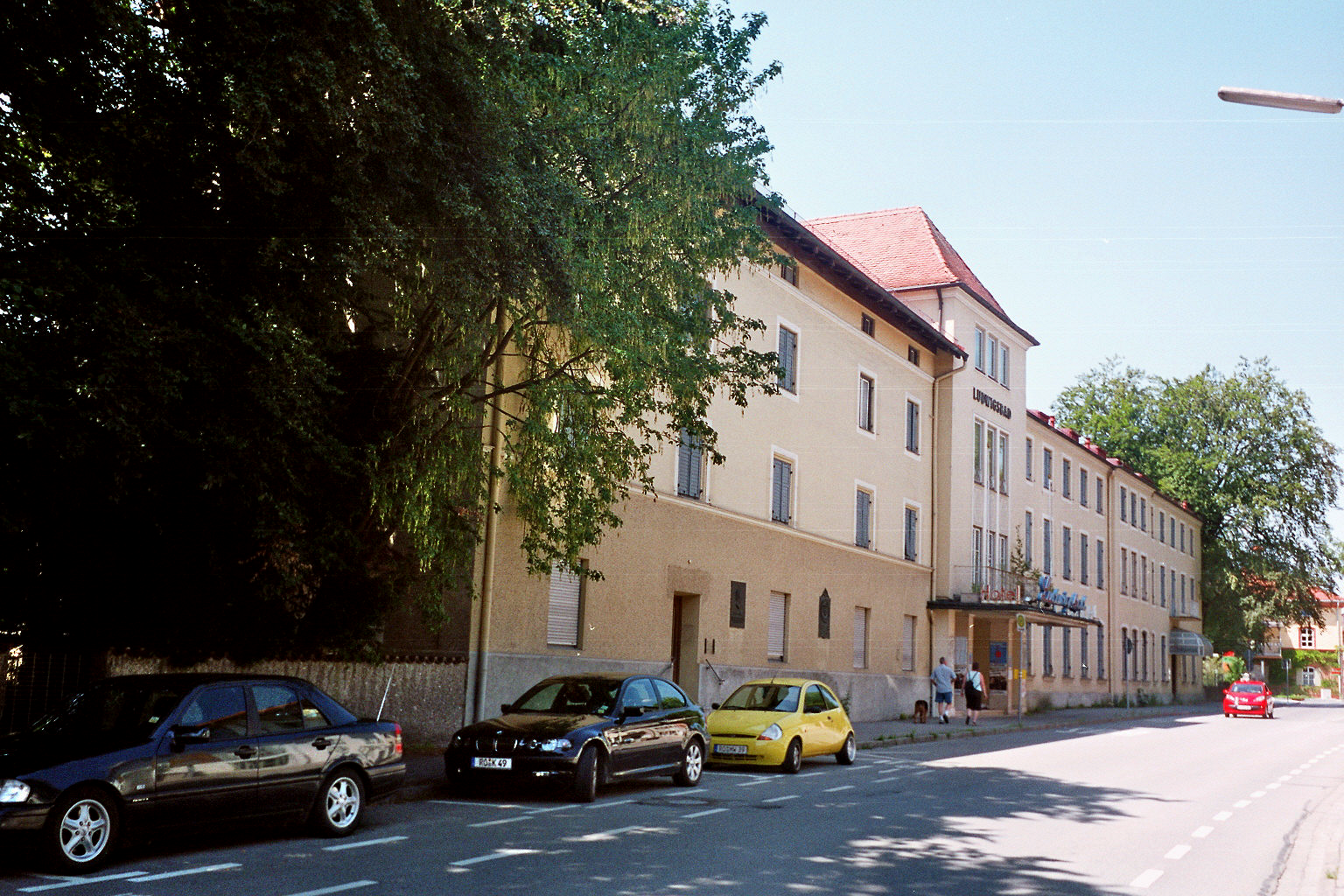
The dismantled spa hotel Ludwigsbad before the arson (Summer 2006)
