= Igor Kaczurowskyj =

Ukrainian poet, translator, writer, literary scholar, and journalist (1918–2013)

- Ігор Качуровський
- Born: Igor Vasilyevich Kaczurowskyj; Ігор Васильович Качуровський; 1 September 1918; Nizhyn, Chernigov Governorate, Ukrainian State (present-day Ukraine)
- Died: 18 July 2013 (aged 94); Munich, Germany
- Burial place: Kruty, Ukraine
- Other name: Ihor Kachurovs'kyi
- Citizenship: Argentina
- Occupations: Poet; translator; writer; academic; radio journalist
- Spouse: Lydia Kryukova-Kachurovskaya (m. 1969)
- Children: 1
- Relatives: Boris Kriukow (father-in-law); Olga Gurski (mother-in-law)

Academic background
- Education: Kursk State Pedagogical Institute, 1941; Ukrainian Free University

Academic work
- Institutions: Pontifical Catholic University of Argentina; Universidad del Salvador; Ukrainian Free University
- Writing career
- Language: Ukrainian; Russian; Spanish
- Notable works: “Generyka i Arkhitektonika” (“Literary Genres and Structure”): vol. 1 “Literatura evropeys'koho serednyovichchya” (“European Literature of the Middle Ages”); “Svichada vichnosty” (“Mirrors of Eternity”)
- Movement: Neoclassicism

Signature
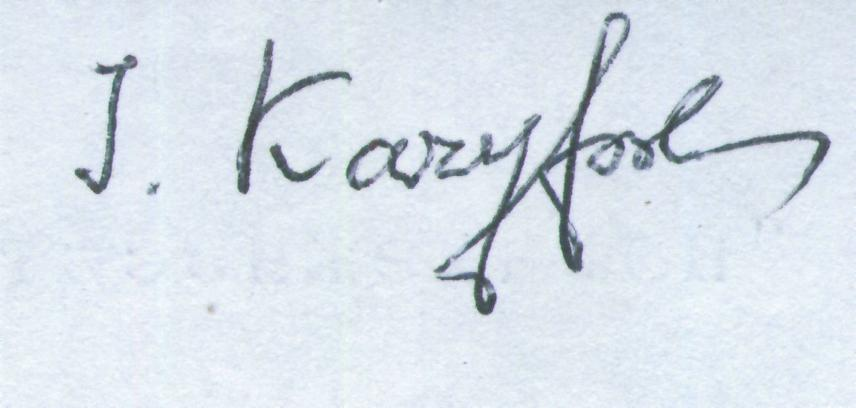

Igor Kaczurowskyj (Ukrainian: Ігор Качуровський; 1 September 1918 – 18 July 2013) was a Ukrainian poet, translator, writer, academic and radio journalist.

== Early life and education ==
Igor Vasilyevich Kaczurowskyj was born on 1 September 1918 in Nizhyn, Ukrainian State (present-day Ukraine) to a Ukrainian Jewish family. Kaczurowskyj's mother, Yevgeniya Oleksandrivna Kachurovskaya (Ukrainian: Євгенія Олександрівна Качуровська; née Sakovich), was a member of the Ukrainian nobility and graduate of the Women's Higher Courses. His father, Vasyl Antonovich Kachurovsky (Ukrainian: Василь Антонович Качуровський), held a law degree from Saint Vladimir Imperial University of Kiev and an economics degree in absentia from a university in Moscow. During the Ukrainian People's Republic Kaczurowskyj's father was a member of the Central Rada, serving as assistant state secretary and later as the financial officer of Nizhyn district.

Kaczurowskyj first lived in the village of Kruty however, in order to avoid Soviet repression the Kaczurowskyj family initially moved to Nizhyn in November 1930 before settling in Mala Vyska in spring 1931. In 1932, the family relocated to Kursk, Russian SFSR (present-day Russia).

In 1937 Kaczurowskyj completed his secondary education and began attending the Kursk State Pedagogical Institute, studying under Boris Jarkho and Petro Odarchenko. Kaczurowskyj graduated in 1941.

== Career ==
=== Austria ===
The Kaczurowskyj family returned to Kruty in 1942 but later in 1943 escaped through Western Ukraine into the Slovak Republic. The family later relocated to Allied-occupied Austria (present-day Austria) and from 1945 onwards lived in Camp 373, a Displaced Persons Camp in Spittal an der Drau.

In 1946, Kaczurowskyj's poem "How good it is that you are not with me" (Ukrainian: Як це добре, що ти не зі мною) was published in Ostanni Novyny (Ukrainian: Останні новини), a Ukrainian language newspaper in Salzburg. In 1947, Kaczurowskyj won an award for the short story "Passport" (Ukrainian: Пашпорт) from the publishing house "Novi Dni" (Ukrainian: Нові дні), and began co-operating with the magazine "Kettle-drums" (Ukrainian: Літаври). In 1948, Kaczurowskyj's first collection of poetry "Over the Bright Source" (Ukrainian: Над світлим джерелом) was published.

During this period Kaczurowskyj was one of the founding members of the Salzburg based Union of Ukrainian Scholars, Writers and Artists.

=== Argentina ===
Towards the end of 1948 Kaczurowskyj and his family emigrated to Argentina and settled near Buenos Aires. Kaczurowskyj first worked as a labourer on a port railway repair crew and later as a port janitor, whilst studying Spanish in his spare time.

During this period Kaczurowskyj edited the magazine "Porohy" ("Dnipro-Waterfalls"), wrote for the periodicals "Ovyd" ("Outlook"), "Mitla" ("The Broom"), "Novi Dni" ("New Days"). In 1958–62 he assisted the Instituto Grafotécnico (a Literary Institution); 1963–64 he lectured on Ancient Ukrainian literature at the Pontifical Catholic University of Argentina, in 1968 on Russian literature at the Universidad del Salvador, both in Buenos Aires.

=== Germany ===
In 1969 he moved to Munich (German Federal Republic), remaining nevertheless a citizen of Argentina. In the 1970–80s he wrote and broadcast over two-thousand scripts, as a literary commentator (program specialist) at the "Ukrainian Desk" of the broadcasting service Radio Free Europe/Radio Liberty. At the Ukrainian Free University (Munich), he obtained his PhD degree for his thesis "Old Slavic beliefs and their connections with Indo-Iranian religions"; from 1973 on he lectured at the UFU, from 1982 as an ordinary professor; at the Faculty of Philosophy he held lectures on Metre (poetry)versification, stylistics, theory of literary genres, history of the Ukrainian literature of the 1920–30s, History of Medieval European literature. He was a member of the Association of Ukrainian Writers in Exile "Slovo" ("The Word"), the Union of Argentine Writers SADE (Sociedad Argentina de Escritores), National Writers' Union of Ukraine (since 1992).

=== Poetry ===
Igor Kaczurowskyj is the author of the following books of verse: "Nad Svitlym Dzherelom" ("At The Luminous Fountain), Salzburg 1948; "V Dalekiy Havani" ("In The Far Harbor"), Buenos Aires 1956; "Pisnya Pro Bilyi Parus" ("White Sail Song"), Munich 1971; "Svichada Vichnosty" ("Mirrors of Eternity"), Munich 1990; "Osinni Piznyotsvity" ("Autumn Crocuses"), Kyiv 2000, 2001). The last was published in one volume, along with the poem "Selo" ("The Village"; 1st edition: Neu-Ulm 1960; 4th edition with the title "Selo v Bezodni" ("The Village in an Abyss"; Kyiv 2006). The final collection of selected poems named "Liryka" was published in Lviv (2013).

As a poet Kaczurowskyj was a follower of the Kyiv neoclassicists, a literary disciple of Mykhailo Orest (along with Orest, he is supposed to be one of the representatives of the post-neoclassical movement, or younger neoclassicists). Similar to Mykola Zerov and the poets of his literary school, Kaczurowskyj was a master in "poetry of the second degree" (in his own terminology "transpositive poetry") such a "poetry of culture" which is considered by Dmytro Nalyvayko as one of the major attributes of classicism as a type of artistic thought (section "Stara Evropa" ("Ancient Europe") in the book "Svichada vichnosty"). At the same time Kaczurowskyj composed refined love poems (section "Pisnya pro bilyi parus" in the book of verse of the same title), and poetry of nature (section "Hrybna mistyka" ("Mushroom mysticism") in "Svichada vichnosty"). In general, Kaczurowskyj's poetry is marked by a painful disharmony between spiritualized beauty embodied in primeval nature, the masterworks of art of the past ages and the spiritual decay of modern civilization, between high human feelings and contrasts of social reality. His long poem "Selo" was the first great epic in Ukrainian literature depicting the tragedy of Ukrainian Holodomor (Famine-Genocide) of 1932–3.

The main characteristics of his poetical style, are a neoclassical clarity, achieved by open metaphors, a refined lexis, a select poetical language, free of every coarseness or vulgarism, the strict adherence to the accentual-syllabic (classic) verse meter, and the perfect dominion of canons ruling the poems' stanzas (mostly of Roman origin).

Kaczurowskyj's poetical parodies, epigrams, jests, and other humorous writings, used to be published, abroad and in Ukraine, under the pseudonym Khvedosiy Chichka.

As a writer for children, Kaczurowskyj is the author of the long poem "Pan Kotskyi" ("Mister Kotskyi"; the first edition, Kyiv 1992; the second edition, Kyiv 2016, under the patronage of the German Embassy in Kyiv, with a German adaptation, in verse, by Wilhelm Steinbüchler), and the book "U svynyachomu tsarstvi" ("In The Wild Boars' Kingdom", Munich 1997).

=== Prose ===
His prose writings comprise the novel "Shlyakh nevidomoho" ("The Way of an Unknown"), Munich 1956, which later was translated into English by Yuriy Tkach ("Because Deserters Are Immortal", Doncaster, Australia 1979) and into German by Lidia Kriukow ("Der Weg eines Unbekannten: Geschichte eines ukrainischen Deserteurs", Frankfurt am Main 2018); the novel "Dim nad krucheyu" ("House on a Cliff"), Munich 1966; these books consist of episodes, relating the adventures of a young Ukrainian intellectual during the Second World War, between two demoniac forces, the Soviets, and Hitler's nationalists, some reviewers, such as Caroline Egerton of "The Age", Melbourne, and Petro Soroka, Ukraine, remarking their anti-existencialist motives; a shorter story "Zaliznyi kurkul'" ("The Iron Landowner"), Munich 1959, Poltava 2005; a series of short stories, among which: "Po toy bik bezodni" ("Beyond the Abyss"), published in English in: "Urania" (A Journal of Creative Writing and Literary Studies), Kanpur, India, vol. I, #I, 1987; "Krynytsya bez vahadla" ("A Pit Without A Pendulum"); "Ochi Atosa" ("The Eyes Of Athos [a dog]"); "Tsybulyane vesillya" ("The Onion-Wedding"), etc., all his prose writings being published, jointly, in one volume with the title "Shlyakh nevidomoho", Kyiv 2006 (442 pages). Kaczurowskyj's memoirs are published in his book "Kruty moho dytynstva" ("The Village Kruty of My Childhood"), Nizhyn 2007, and the complete posthumous collection of his memoirs "Spomyny i postati" ("Memoirs and Figures", Kyiv 2018).

=== Translations ===
Kaczurowskyj was fluent in Ukrainian and Russian. Igor Kaczurowskyj's translations of poetry had primarily appeared as parts of his aforementioned books of verse. Also, separate books of translations were published, such as: Francesco Petrarca "Vybrane" ("Selected Poems)", Munich 1982; "Zolota haluzka" ("Golden Branch"), being a collection of Iberian and Ibero-American poetry, from Spanish, Portuguese, and Catalan languages, Buenos Aires–Munich 1991; "Okno v ukrainskuyu poeziyu" ("A Window To Ukrainian Poetry"), Ukrainian poems in Russian translations, Munich–Kharkiv–Nizhyn 1997; "Stezhka kriz' bezmir" ("A Path Through The Immens"), 100 German poems, 750–1950, Paris–Lviv–Zwickau 2000; "Pisnya pro Rolanda" ("Song of Roland"), from Old French, maintaining the original syllabic metre, Lviv 2008; "Choven bez rybalky" by Alejandro Casona, a theatrical piece, translated from Spanish ("Boat Without Fisherman"), Buenos Aires 2000; "Nobelivs'ka lektsiya z literatury" ("Nobel Literature Lesson") by Aleksandr Solzhenitsyn, Neu Ulm 1973. The compilatory volume of his translations, "Kruh ponadzemnyi" ("The Super-Terrestrial Circle"), Kyiv 2007 (526 pages) comprises approximately 670 poems and fragments of over 350 authors, translated from 23 old and modern languages, first of all from Spanish (fragments of "Cantar de mio Cid", works of José Asunción Silva, Rubén Darío, Amado Nervo, Juan Ramón Jiménez, Alfonsina Storni, Gabriela Mistral, Federico García Lorca, Jorge Luis Borges, etc.), from Italian (the early sonnet writers: Petrarch, Michelangelo, etc., Portuguese (Olavo Bilac, etc.), from German (the Minnesingers, Friedrich Hölderlin, Ludwig Uhland, Joseph von Eichendorff, Friedrich Rückert, Annette von Droste-Hülshoff, etc.), from English (ballads, Alfred Tennyson, etc.), from French (José Maria de Heredia, Paul Verlaine, Arthur Rimbaud, etc.), Polish (Julian Tuwim, etc.), Russian (Fedor Tyutchev, Aleksey Tolstoy, Fedor Sologub, Ivan Bunin, Maksimilian Voloshin, Nikolay Gumilyov, Anna Akhmatova, Osip Mandel'shtam, Sergey Yesenin, Leonid Kiselyov, etc.), and also from Ukrainian into Russian (Maksym Ryls'kyi, Mykola Zerov, Yuriy Klen, Volodymyr Svidzyns'kyi, Yevhen Pluzhnyk, Mykhaylo Orest, Oleh Olzhych, Lina Kostenko, etc.). Igor Kaczurowskyj considered himself a follower of Mykola Zerov's translating school, that is the translation of each verse with a maximum approach to the original, not only as regards the contents, but the metrical, and stylistic particularities as well. Sometimes, he recurred to prose interlinear translations made by Lidia Kriukow, who is familiar with many European languages.

=== Scientific work ===
In literary theory, Kaczurowskyj's major aim was the development of the principles put forward by Boris Yarkho and Volodymyr Derzhavyn. He is the author of several textbooks of theory of literature, which was the main subject — along with History of Literature — of his lectures and scientific papers. They are:

- "Novela yak zhanr" ("The Short Story as a Genre"), Buenos Aires 1958;
- "Strofika" ("A Study of Stanzas"), Munich 1967;
- "Fonika" ("Phonic"), Munich 1984;
- "Narys komparatyvnoyi metryky" ("An Outline on Comparative Meters"). Munich 1985; second edition: Kyiv 1994;
- Stylistic: "Osnovy analizy movnykh form" ("Basic Analysis of Linguistic Patterns"), 1. "Leksyka" ("Lexis"), Munich–Nizhyn 1994, 2. "Figury i tropy" ("Figures and Tropes"), Munich–Kyiv 1995;
- "Generyka i Arkhitektonika" ("Literary Genres and Structure"): 1. "Literatura evropeys'koho serednyovichchya" ("European Literature of the Middle Ages"), a great work, with numerous translations into Ukrainian, analysis, etc., and an "Introduction" by Ivan Dzyuba, 380 pp., richly illustrated, Kyiv 2005, 2. "Zasady naukovoho literaturoznavstva" ("Principles of Literary Sciences") and "Zhanry novoho pys'menstva" ("New Literature Genres"), Kyiv 2008.

A synthesis of Kaczurowskyj's research work as a historian of Ukrainian literature, may be found in his book "Promenysti syl'vety" ("Shining Silhouettes") – lectures, papers, articles, essays, treatises, the main purpose of this work being to recall to mind the wrongly forgotten gifted authors of Ukrainian literature, especially those of the Second World War generation, and to relieve the minds of readers and researchers from the stereotype concepts regarding famous representatives of Ukrainian literature (Taras Shevchenko, Ivan Franko, Lesya Ukrayinka).

Selected broadcasting scripts on arts and literature from "Radio Liberty" were compiled in a volume: "150 vikon u svit" ("150 Windows to The World"), Kyiv 2008.

Due to the aesthetic concepts and canons featured in his textbooks and other writings, Kaczurowskyj may be considered an outstanding advocate of the theories of Ukrainian neoclassicism (along with Volodymyr Derzhavyn). He participates in the conviction that Beauty "is the greatest welfare, as a definite artistic synthesis of Goodness and Truth" (Derzhavyn), he advocates the autonomy of art, which, in his opinion, "is completely independent of social, political, climatic or any other circumstances", he defends the long duration of the traditions of artistic creativity, as a contrast and in opposition to the so-called post-modernism and its negation of past times artistic achievements.

Kaczurowskyj is the editor, together with Sviatoslav Hordynsky and Lidia Kriukow, as well as author of the "Forewords" ("Introductions") of the volumes: "Khrestomatiya ukrayins'koyi relihiynoyi literatury. Knyha persha – Poeziya" ("Chrestomathy of Ukrainian Religious Poetry"), Munich–London 1988, and the collection "Italiya v ukrayins'kiy poeziyi" ("Italy in Ukrainian Poetry"), Lviv 1999; he is also the editor of other editions, as well as the author of the introductions to the volumes: Mykhaylo Orest: "Pizni vruna" ("Late Blossoming"), Munich 1965; "Ukrayins'ka muza" ("Ukrainian Muse"), 2nd ed. by Oleksa Kovalenko, Buenos Aires 1973; and Yuriy Klen: "Tvory" ("Works"), part 1, New York 1992, etc.

Kaczurowskyj is the author of a popular essay on mycology: "Putivnyk dlya hrybariv" ("A Guidebook for Mushroom Hunters") conjointly with V. Ya. Baranov: "Vid Kyeva do Kachanivky cherez Nizhyn" ("From Kyiv to Kachanivka Through Nizhyn"), Kyiv 2011.

== Personal life and death ==
On 20 June 1968, Kaczurowskyj married Lydia Kryukova-Kachurovskaya (Ukrainian: Лідія Крюкова-Качуровська; 1935–2020), a translator and art critic, with whom he had one son. Through his marriage to Kryukova-Kachurovskaya, Kaczurowskyj was the son-in-law of the artist Boris Kriukow and the painter Olga Gurski.

On 18 July 2013 Kaczurowskyj died in Munich aged 94. Kaczurowskyj's ashes were buried in Kruty on 22 November 2013.

== Awards ==
- 1982 — Ivan Franko Fund (Chicago, United States) prize, awarded for the translation of Francesco Petrarca's book "Selected".
- 1994 — Maksym Ryls'kyi Prize, for his work as a translator.
- 2002 — award of the SUCHASNIST magazine and the League of Ukrainian Patrons of Art, for his essay "Gothic Literature And Its Genres"
- 2003 — Volodymyr Vynnychenko Prize, for his outstanding intellectual contribution to the development of Ukrainian culture.
- 2006 — Volodymyr Svidzins'kyi Literary Award, for his activity as a poet and translator.
- 2006 — National Taras Shevchenko Prize of Ukraine, for his book "Promenysti syl'vety (lectures, papers, articles, conferences, essays, treatises)", Munich 2002; 2nd ed. in the "Library of the Shevchenko Committee" series, Kyiv 2008.
