= Boris Kriukow =

- Борис Крюков
- Born: Boris Ivanovich Kriukow; Борис Іванович Крюков; 19 January 1895; Orgeev, Bessarabia Governorate, Russian Empire (present day Orhei, Moldova)
- Died: 6 March 1967 (aged 72); Buenos Aires, Argentina
- Resting place: Cementerio Británico
- Citizenship: Argentina
- Occupations: Painter, graphic and mosaic artist
- Spouse: Olga Gurski
- Relatives: Igor Kaczurowskyj (son-in-law)

Boris Kriukow (Ukrainian: Борис Крюков; January 19, 1895 – March 6, 1967), also known by the pseudonym Ivan Usatenko (Ukrainian: Іван Усатенко), was a Ukrainian–Argentine artist.

== Early life and education ==
Boris Ivanovich Kriukow (Note: It is possible that his original surname was Kryukiv (Ukrainian: Крюків) but the family kept the Ukrainian spelling even abroad.) (Ukrainian: Борис Іванович Крюков) was born on 19 January 1895 in Orgeev, Russian Empire (present day Orhei, Moldova) to a Ukrainian family. Kriukow's father was a local court official.

Kriukow studied at Fedir Krychevsky's art school in Kyiv, finishing his training in 1918.

== Career ==
In 1918, Kriukow moved to Kamenets to teach at the local tekhnikum. As an artist, Kriukow focused on graphic art, and in the interwar period he illustrated over 500 books, among them works by Shevchenko, Franko, Dickens, Antonenko-Davydovych, etc., as well as books for children by N. Zabila, L. Pervomaysky, and others. He was recognized as one of the best graphic artists in Ukraine. During World War II, 1943, he moved to Lviv, where he took part in an exhibition, one of his paintings being called by art critics "the jewel" of that exhibition. From 1944 to 1948 he lived in Austria, and painted under the pseudonym of Ivan Usatenko, taking part in art exhibitions in Salzburg, Innsbruck, etc.

In 1948, he emigrated to Argentina with his wife, fellow Ukrainian artist Olga Gurski, and settled in Buenos Aires, where he held personal exhibitions in the most renowned art galleries, such as Müller, Van Riel, and Whitcomb, almost yearly (1949–1965). His oil paintings were also exhibited in Canada (Toronto, 1956), and USA (New York City, 1963 and 1965).

At the same time, he worked as a book illustrator for both Argentine and Ukrainian publishing houses. 1950–1960 he illustrated up to 80 Ukrainian books for Mykola Denysiuk publishers, Buenos Aires. He cooperated, too, with the Julian Serediak publishing firm, editors of the "Mitla" (The Broom) humor magazine, where his own book, Smikholina (Laughter-Drops) was published (1966).

From 1950 until his death, he was the only illustrator for the Clásicos inolvidables ("Unforgettable Classics") collection published by Ateneo publishing house in Buenos Aires:

- Arabian Nights (1950 and 1956);
- Edgar Allan Poe: Selected Tales (1951);
- Dante Alighieri: The Divine Comedy (1952);
- Giovanni Boccaccio: Decamerone (1953);
- Miguel de Cervantes Saavedra: Don Quixote (1954);
- Selected Works by: Francisco de Quevedo (1957), Anatole France (1958), Émile Zola (1961).

Along with his work for Ateneo, he illustrated books for another Argentine publishing house, Atlántida:

- White Fang by Jack London (1956);
- Little Lord Fauntleroy by Frances Hodgson Burnett (1956);
- Little Men (1955) and Little Women (1964) by Louisa M. Alcott;
- Heidi (1957) by J. Spiry;
- The Adventures of Buffalo Bill (1964) by W. F. Cody.

Also for Atlántida, he produced colorful paintings of animals and the like, for smaller children.

After his death in 1967, the well known Ukrainian writer and poet Igor Kaczurowskyj (the painter's son in law) was inspired by some twenty pictures Kriukow had made, in his spare time, on the subject of the old Ukrainian tale about the cat "Mister Kotsky", to write a long poem for children, which, many years later (1992) was to be published in Ukraine, illustrated by these same pictures from the artist's heritage.

In 1965, he was invited to exhibit in Buenos Aires Town Hall, after having received two important rewards: 1964, for his drawing Don Quixote, presented at an international art competition of the "Codex" publishing house, Madrid, and for his drawing Don Segundo Sombra, from "Codex Argentina".

He is the author of a large oil picture of Cardinal Josyf Slipy, and of the Argentine heroes José de San Martín (at the battle of Chacabuco; Buenos Aires Town Hall), and Admiral Guillermo Brown (unfinished; donated by his family to the Brown Institute after his death.

His last, finished, work was the apsis mosaic of The Virgin and Child, executed for the Ukrainian cathedral of the ''Holy Protection'' in Buenos Aires, and crowned by Pope John Paul II, in 1988, the millennium of Christianity in Ukraine.

== Personal life ==
Kriukow was married to Olga Gurski, with whom he had Lydia Kryukova-Kachurovskaya (Ukrainian: Лідія Крюкова-Качуровська; 1935–2020), a translator and art critic. Through his daughter Kriukow was the father-in-law of Igor Kaczurowskyj, a poet, translator, writer, academic and radio journalist.

Kriukow died on 6 March 1967 in Buenos Aires aged 72.

== Legacy ==
Posthumous exhibitions were held in New York City and Toronto (1969), Munich (1977), and Bad Aibling (Bavaria, 1980). In 1970, a monograph about him ("Boris Kriukow") in Ukrainian, Spanish, and English was published.
