= Desiderius Beck =

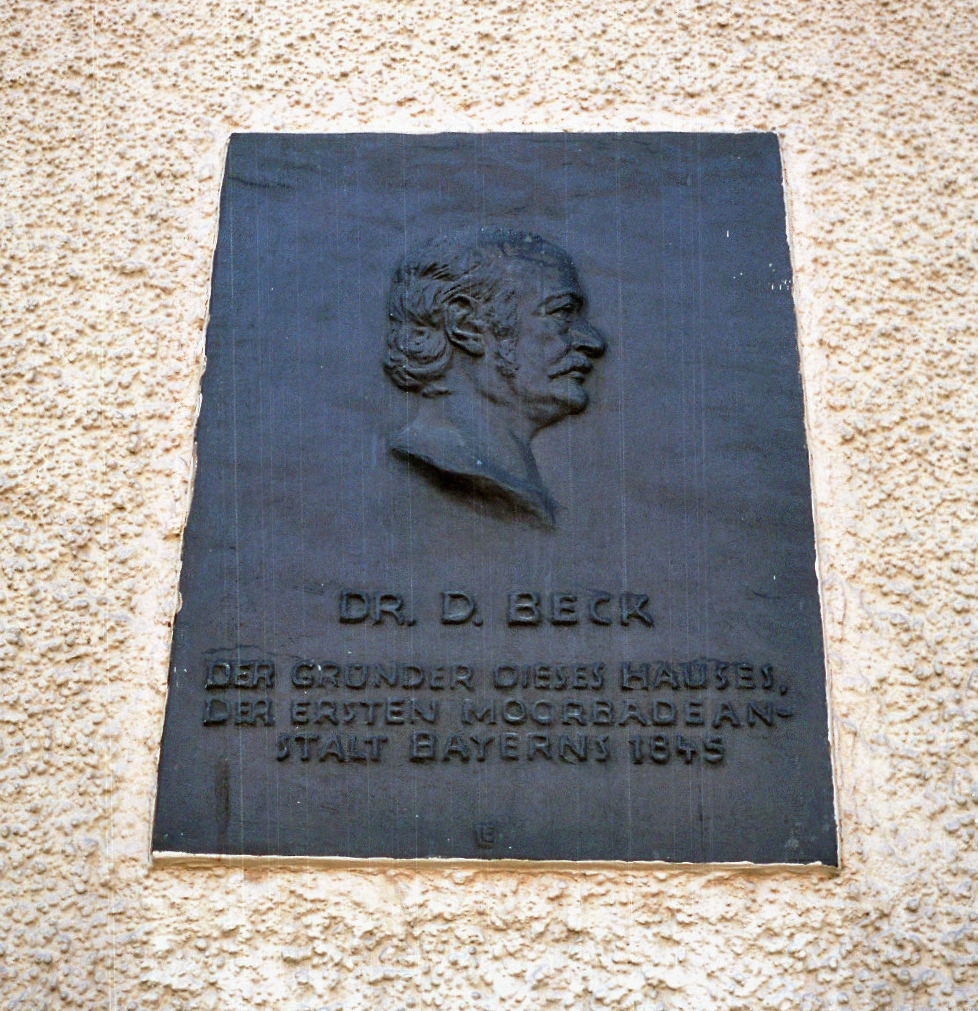
- Plaque honoring Beck at the former Ludwigsbad Hotel in Bad Aibling
- Born: January 12, 1804; Ebersberg, Germany
- Died: August 11, 1877 (aged 73); Bad Aibling, Germany

Desiderius Beck (January 12, 1804 – August 11, 1877) was a royal Bavarian court medical doctor. In 1845 he opened the first Bavarian brine and mud bathing establishment in Bad Aibling on Rosengasse, which later became Ludwigsbad.

Beck failed due to a lack of entrepreneurial skills and the general rejection of the Aiblingen population. It was not until 1857 that the railway began to supply Bad Aibling with visitors that the entrepreneur Karl von Berüff took up Beck's idea. His bathing establishment was named Ludwigsbad in 1871 in honor of the King of Bavaria.

The recognition of Beck's services to Bad Aibling was delayed; he received honorary citizenship of the city in 1875, only two years before his death. In 2007, his concept of a combination of mud and brine therapy was resumed with the opening of the Bad Aibling thermal baths. Before that, peat pulp baths were Bad Aibling's only therapeutic remedy for decades.

Today the city of Bad Aibling awards the Desiderius Beck Medal, which is dedicated to his memory, and given to qualified recipients at irregular intervals.

In the summer of 2009, the play “Desiderius - or the end of the beginning”, written by Christine and Klaus Jörg Schönmetzler, was performed in the Bad Aiblinger exhibition hall. It deals with Beck's life in Bad Aibling and the emergence and decline of his bathing establishment.
