= Korenevo =

Korenevo (Russian: Коренево) is the name of several inhabited localities in Russia.

Urban localities

- Korenevo, Korenevsky District, Kursk Oblast, a work settlement in Korenevsky District of Kursk Oblast

Rural localities

- Korenevo, Kaluga Oblast, a village in Zhizdrinsky District of Kaluga Oblast
- Korenevo, Korenevsky Selsoviet, Korenevsky District, Kursk Oblast, a selo in Korenevsky Selsoviet of Korenevsky District of Kursk Oblast
- Korenevo, Nizhny Novgorod Oblast, a village in Mezhdurechensky Selsoviet of Sokolsky District of Nizhny Novgorod Oblast
- Korenevo, Omsk Oblast, a selo in Zalivinsky Rural Okrug of Tarsky District of Omsk Oblast
- Korenevo, Pskov Oblast, a village in Pustoshkinsky District of Pskov Oblast
- Korenevo, Ryazan Oblast, a village in Solominsky Rural Okrug of Klepikovsky District of Ryazan Oblast
- Korenevo, Vologda Oblast, a village in Pudegsky Selsoviet of Vologodsky District of Vologda Oblast
