= Olga Gurski =

Ukrainian artist (1902–1975)

- Born: March 18, 1902; Korenevo, Russian Empire
- Died: April 19, 1975 (aged 73); Buenos Aires, Argentina
- Citizenship: Argentina
- Education: Kiev Art Institute
- Known for: portraits, landscapes, still life
- Movement: Post-Impressionism

Olga Gurski (Ukrainian: Ольга Сергіївна Гурська; March 19, 1902 – April 19, 1975), her surname sometimes given as Gursky or Kriukow (after her husband Boris Kriukow), was a Ukrainian Argentine painter.

== Life and work ==
Olga Gurski traces her descent from an old Ukrainian, formerly Polish, and before that Czech nobility of the 13th century, of the Sternberg coat of arms. It should be mentioned that, fearing the Soviet Russian repressions, she buried the documents she was entrusted with by her dying father, — some of them dating from the 18th century, when the old lineage settled in Chernigov in the Russian Empire (currently in Ukraine) — and only disinterred them in 1943, during World War II.

She graduated from the Kiev Art School in 1929. In 1943, she moved to the West: at first to Lviv, later to Austria. There, having settled in Gmunden, on the Lake Traun, she took part in various art exhibitions (Linz, Salzburg), where her paintings were highly praised by the critics.

In 1948, she emigrated to Argentina, took up her residence in Buenos Aires, and became a citizen of that country.

Exhibitions of her paintings were held almost every year in Buenos Aires' renowned art galleries, such as Müller, Van Riel, Whitcomb, etc., and in the United States and Canada as well. From the Buenos Aires Provincial Government, she received a special invitation to exhibit her works in Mar del Plata, the famous sea side resort.

Colored plates of some of her canvases illustrated the women's magazine es:Para tí.

After numerous experiments concerning a painting technique to adopt, she definitely turned to a manner which can best be described as a late Post-Impressionism, where, as quoted be the art critic Pedro H. Bidart, "the colors flow like a piece of music by Ravel, or Debussy".

== Exhibitions ==
=== Some exhibition (incomplete) ===
- 1943 — Ukrainian Central Committee. Union of Ukrainian Artists in Lviv.
- 1946 — Ukrainian Art Exhibition — Salzburg, 6–10 October.
- 1947 — Austrian Association of Art Professionals. Upper Austrian Branch. Linz, 28 August — 18 September.
- 1954 — Müller Gallery, Buenos Aires. Solo exhibition, 23 August — 4 September.
- 1955 — Müller Gallery, Buenos Aires. Solo exhibition, 5–17 September.
- 1956 — Van Riel Gallery, Buenos Aires. Solo exhibition, October.
- 1957 — Art Gallery "Hotel Provincial", Mar del Plata. Personal Exhibition, upon a special invitation of the Ministry of Economy, division Tourism & Parks (B. A. Province), 15–24 April.
- 1958 — Ukrainian Association "Prosvita", Buenos Aires, 6–20 September.
- 1959 — "Prosvita" Spring Art Exhibition, Association of Ukrainian Artists in Argentina, Buenos Aires, 3–20 October.
- 1965 — Literature & Art Club Association of Ukrainian Artists in America. New York City, 2–16 May.
- 1965 — Buenos Aires City Council. Hall of Exhibitions.
- 1967 — Alvear Palace Hotel. Solo exhibition, Buenos Aires, 25 May — 13 June.
- 1968 — Ukrainian Women's Association, Dept. 64, New York, 20 October — 3 November.
- 1972 — Ukrainian Women's Association, XVI Exhibition of Women Artists, New York City, 19–26 November.
- 1972 — World Foundation of Ukrainian Women's Associations. Exhibition of Ukrainian Artists, Philadelphia 24 November — 3 December.
- 1972 — Haus der Begegnung, Munich, 15 November.
