= Peloid =

Mud or clay with therapeutic uses

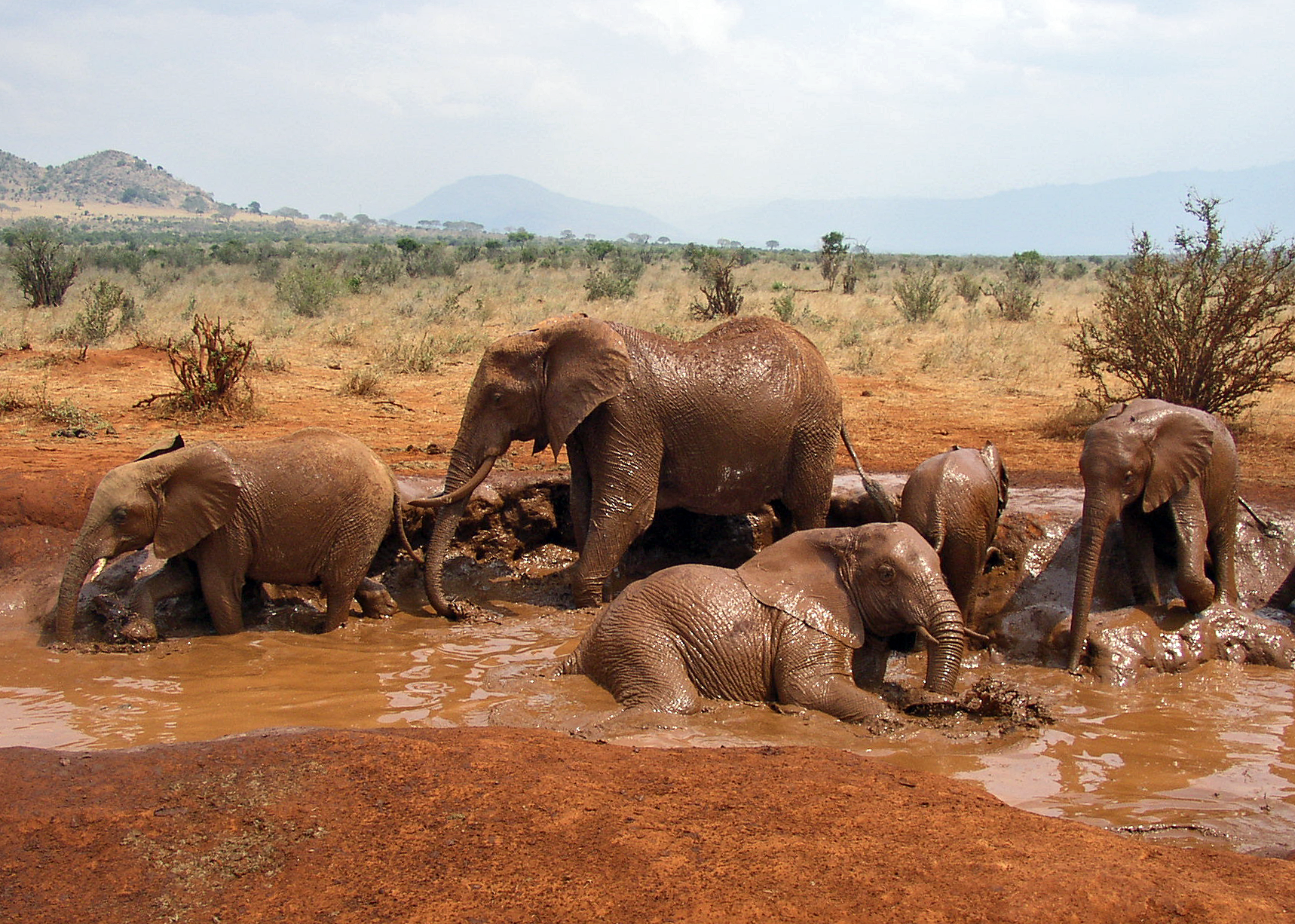
Family of African Bush Elephants taking a mud bath in Tsavo East National Park, Kenya

Peloid is defined as a mature clay, mud or mud suspension or dispersion with curative or cosmetic properties, consisting of a complex mixture of fine-grained materials of geological and/or biological origin, mineral or sea water, and organic compounds commonly arising from some biological metabolic activity", used therapeutically, as part of balneotherapy, or therapeutic bathing. Peloids consist of humus and minerals formed over many years by geological and biological, chemical and physical processes.

Numerous peloids are available today, of which the most popular are peat pulps, various medicinal clays, mined in various locations around the world, and a variety of plant substances. Also, health spas often use locally available lake and sea muds and clays. Peloid procedures are also various; the most common of them are peloid wraps, peloid baths, and peloid packs applied locally to the part of the body, which is being treated.

Peloid packs and, specifically, peat, have been used in Europe for medicinal baths and wraps for the past 200 years.

Peloid preparation varies in different spas. Typically, peloids are matured for a period of up to 2 years in special ponds:

The majority of spas ... use artificial ponds where the natural ("virgin") clay is mixed with mineral, thermo-mineral, or sea water that issues in the vicinity of the spas or inside the spa buildings.

Peloid treatments have been used for rheumatic disorders, osteoarthritis, gynecological disorders, sciatica, skin diseases, trauma and many more various afflictions and ailments.

Peloids are widely used in cosmetology in the form of facial masks. Peloid mask applications result in mild exfoliation, short term hydration and changes in the oil content of the most superficial layer of the skin, the epidermis which consists of dead sloughed poorly compacted cells. However, there is no scientific evidence of any effect on the underlying deeper skin layers below the epidermis or on longer term skin health, such as wrinkle formation, dyspigmentation and loss of elasticity.

== See also ==
- Balneotherapy
- Mud bath
- Peat pulp bath
- Medicinal clay
