= Korenevo, Vologda Oblast =

Korenevo Коренево
- Village
- Location within Vologda Oblast Location within Russia
- Coordinates: 59°07′N 39°21′E
- Country: Russia
- Region: Vologda Oblast
- District: Vologodsky District
- Time zone: UTC+3:00

Korenevo (Russian: Коренево) is a rural locality (a village) in Staroselskoye Rural Settlement, Vologodsky District, Vologda Oblast, Russia. The population was 10 as of 2002.

== Geography ==
Korenevo is located 36 km southwest of Vologda (the district's administrative centre) by road. Ogibalovo is the nearest rural locality.
