= Peat pulp bath =

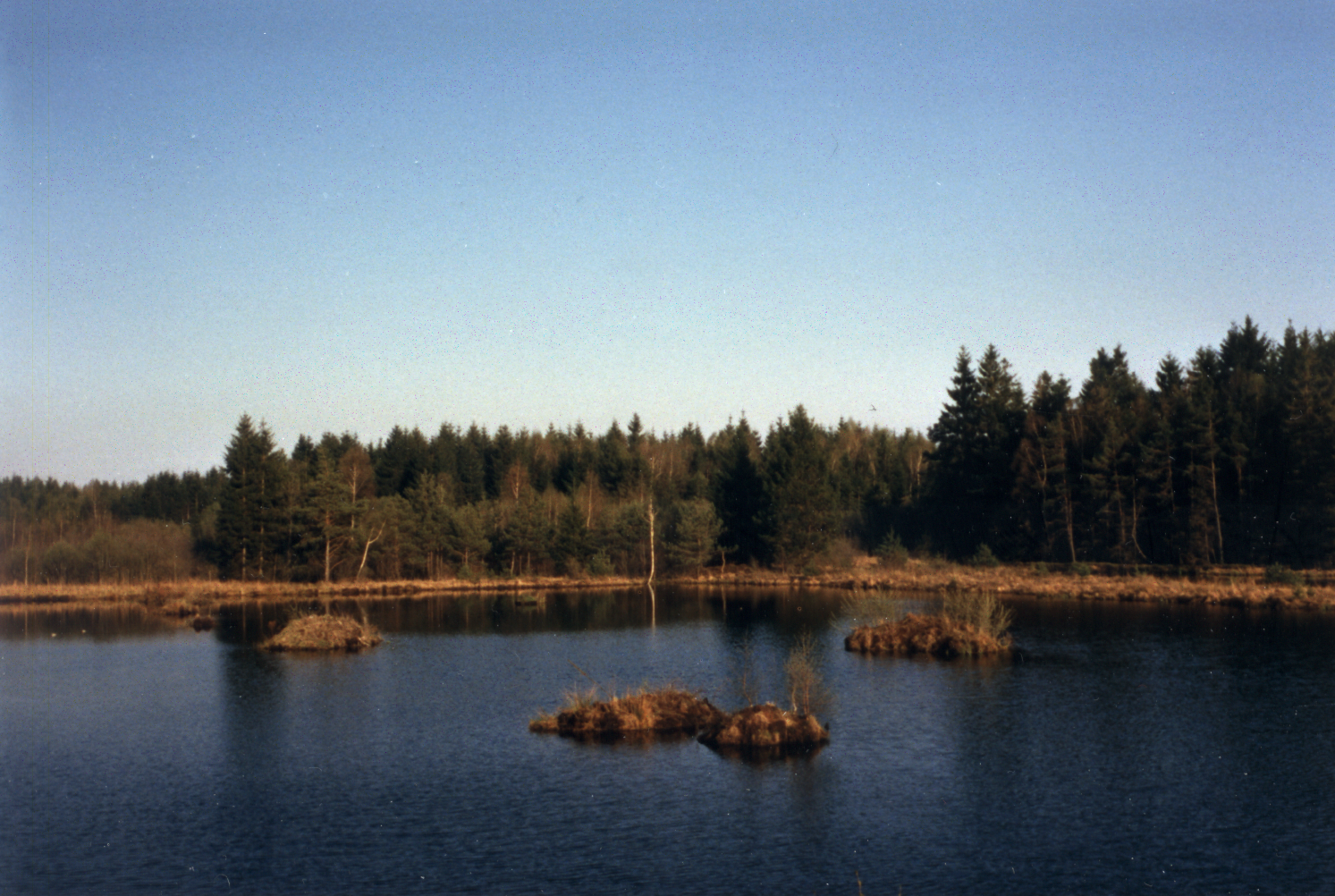
Peat mining near the health resorts Bad Aibling and Bad Feilnbach in Bavaria

A peat pulp bath, a form of peloid therapy, is a bath prepared of peat pulp from wetlands. Balneotherapy in form of peat pulp baths is offered in many health resorts. Its therapeutic principle is based on thermal and/or biochemical effects of peloid application on the human body.

== History ==
Paracelsus described "moor" as a remedy for certain diseases. Later, soldiers of Napoleon learnt about peat pulp and mud baths in Egypt and brought this knowledge to Europe. Jérôme Bonaparte, Napoleon's brother gave command to erect the first health resort with peat applications for his troops after the Battle of Leipzig in Bad Nenndorf. However, an earlier peat pulp resort has been alleged to have existed in Bad Pyrmont in 1802. In the 19th century, peat pulp resorts have been founded in many European health resorts including Marienbad (1813), Franzensbad (1827), Karlsbad (1836) and Bad Aibling (1845).

== Mechanism of action ==
The exact mechanism, by which balneotherapy with peat pulp unfolds beneficial effects, has not been fully clarified. Explanations include effects resulting from the contents of the applied peloids and thermal stress. It is assumed that therapeutic outcomes result from a combination of direct and indirect actions on the body. At the biochemical level, increased concentrations of β-endorphin, ACTH, cortisol, growth hormone, prolactin, insulin-like growth factor-1 and transforming growth factor-β have been observed. On the contrary, circulating levels of prostaglandin E2, leukotriene B4, interleukin-1β and tumour necrosis factor-α decrease after thermal mud therapy.

== Evidence from clinical studies ==
Several clinical trials have analysed the efficiency of mud and peat pulp in a diverse area of diseases. Beneficial effects were observed in rheumatic and other musculoskeletal diseases, hypertension, infertility and diseases of the skin.

In plantar fasciitis, peloid and paraffin treatments had similar beneficial effects on pain and quality of life. In combination with heliotherapy liman peloid baths were effective in the treatment of psoriasis.

In a randomised controlled study including females with symptomatic osteoarthritis, peloid therapy was more effective than paraffin treatment. In subjects with tennis elbow and lower back pain peloid therapy was more effective than kinesio taping or home exercise, respectively.

Balneotherapy with peloids is assumed to be effective for certain chronic gynaecological diseases.

== See also ==
- Balneotherapy
- Bath salts
- Mud-bath
- Peloid

== Additional reading ==
- Online textbook on Peat therapeutics and balneotherapy
- How Peloid Procedures Work and What They Are Made Of
