= Bad Aibling =

Place in Bavaria, Germany

- Town
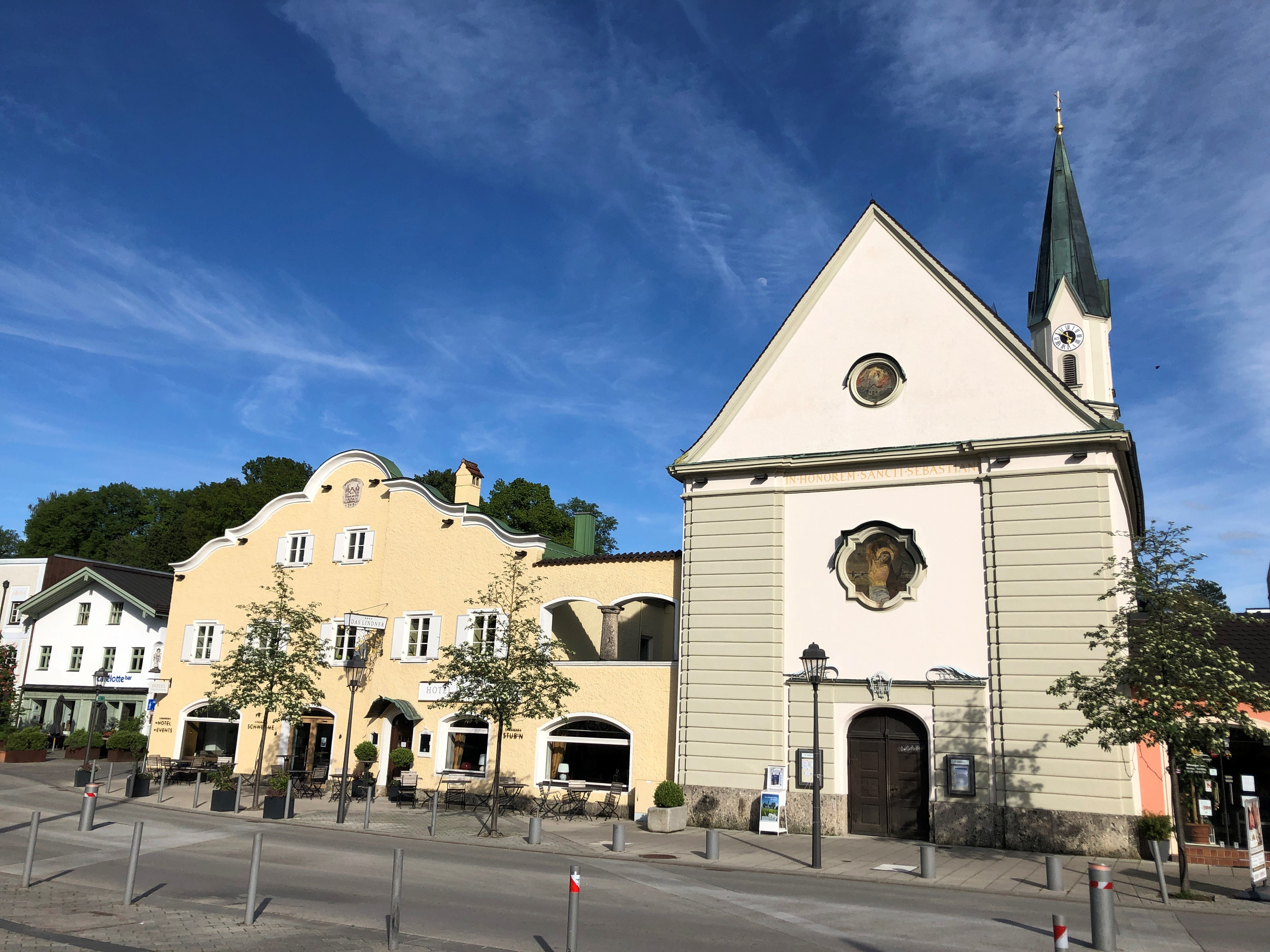
- The former Prantshausen castle and the Church of Saint Sebastian

- Coat of arms

- Location of Bad Aibling within Rosenheim district
- Interactive map of Bad Aibling
- Location within Germany Location within Bavaria
- Coordinates: 47°51′50″N 12°00′36″E
- Country: Germany
- State: Bavaria
- Admin. region: Upper Bavaria
- District: Rosenheim
- Subdivisions: 28 Stadtteile

Government
  - Mayor (2020–26): Stephan Schlier (CSU)

Area
  - Total: 41.4 km^{2} (16.0 sq mi)
- Elevation: 492 m (1,614 ft)

Population (2025-12-31)
  - Total: 18,575
  - Density: 449/km^{2} (1,160/sq mi)
- Time zone: UTC+01:00 (CET)
  - Summer (DST): UTC+02:00 (CEST)
- Postal codes: 83035–83043
- Dialling codes: 08061
- Vehicle registration: RO, AIB
- Website: Official website

Bad Aibling (German pronunciation: [baːt ˈʔaɪblɪŋ]; Bavarian: Oabling) is a spa town and former district seat in Bavaria on the river Mangfall, located some 56 km (35 mi) southeast of Munich. It features a luxury health resort with a peat pulp bath and mineral spa.

== History ==
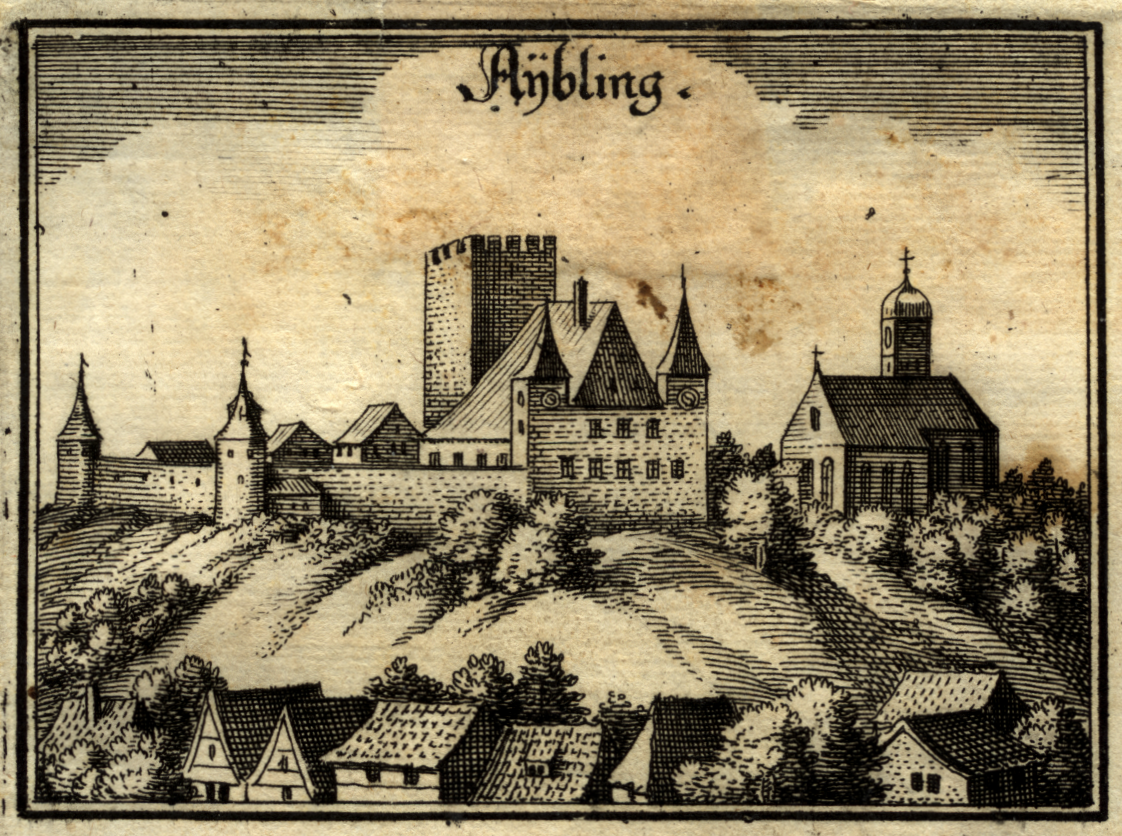
Hofberg. Engraving by Matthäus Merian, 1644.

Bad Aibling and its surroundings were settled by Celtic tribes from about 500 BC until 15 BC. After Roman occupation, it was finally settled by Bavarii tribes in the 5th century AD. In 804, Bad Aibling was mentioned for the first time as "Epininga".

In mediaeval times, it was an administrative centre in the lordship of the Counts of Falkenstein. In 1166, it was mentioned in the Codex diplomaticus Falkensteinensis as "Aibilingen". After the obliteration of the Neuburg-Falkenstein dynasty, it became part of the realm of the Wittelsbach family.

In 1845, the first treatments with peat pulp were offered by the physician Desiderius Beck. Bad Aibling received the title "Bad" (spa or springs) in 1895.

In the year 1933, Bad Aibling officially became a town. After the Second World War, Bad Aibling was the site of POW Discharge Center #26, where German POWs were released from captivity to civilian status. In 1946, a DP camp housing former members of the Royal Yugoslav Army was set up on the grounds of the town's airbase. The camp was first operated by UNRRA, and later by the IRO. From 1948 onwards, the area was home to the IRO Children's Village, a DP camp for unaccompanied children and youth belonging to more than 20 nationalities. Over 2,300 inhabitants passed through this facility (the largest of its kind in the US Zone) before it was closed in late 1951. Later, the area evolved into a major centre for intelligence organizations and secret services.

In 2005, the American Bad Aibling ECHELON station (Field Station 81) closed after several decades of operation. After the departure of the NSA, parts of the station have been used by the Bundesnachrichtendienst (BND), with NSA employees moving to the Mangfall barracks. The radomes are still used intensively. The station is used in cooperation with the NSA, which provides the BND with search terms (such as email addresses), which then forwards the results back to the NSA.

The Thermae opened in 2007, complementing the traditional peat pulp baths with mineral water (Desiderius-Quelle). In the same year, the historical Ludwigsbad spa hotel, the nucleus of Bad Aibling's health resort business, burned down due to arson.

On 9 February 2016, a serious railway accident occurred near the town when two passenger trains collided, causing 11 fatalities.

== Geography and demographics ==
The town of Bad Aibling, with about 18,000 inhabitants, is at 498 m (1,634 ft) above sea level and covers an area of 41.55 km^{2} (16 sq mi).

Bad Aibling consists of the neighborhoods (Stadtteile) of Abel, Adlfurt, Bad Aibling Mitte, Berbling, Ellmosen, Fachendorf, Gröben, Harthausen, Haslach, Heimathsberg, Heinrichsdorf, Holzhausen, Köckbrunn, Markfeld, Mietraching, Mitterham, Moos, Natternberg, Thalacker, Thürham, Unterheufeld, Weg, Westen, Westerham, Willing, and Zell.

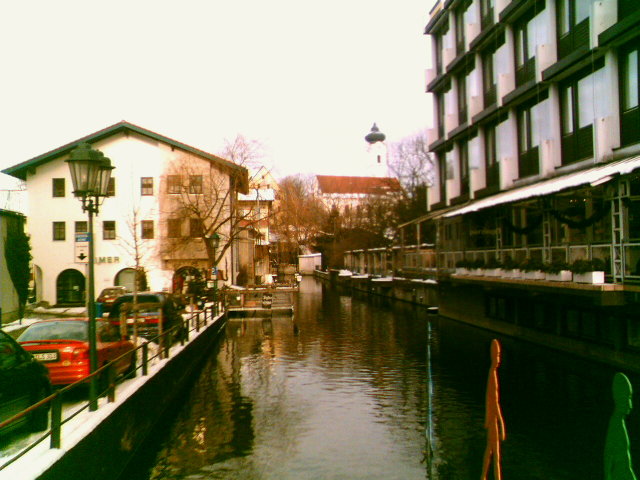
Glonn river in downtown

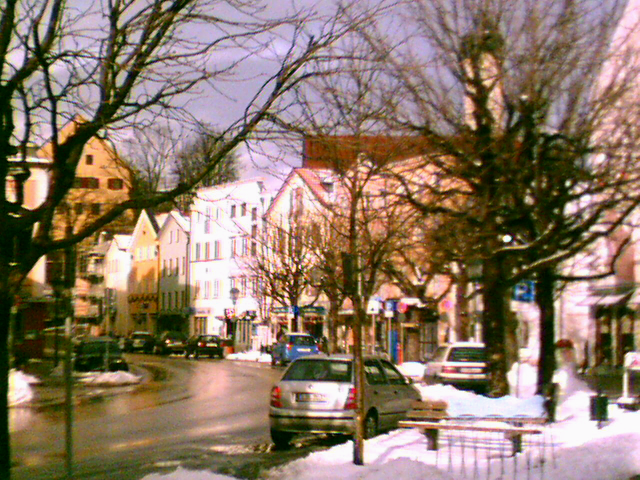
Kirchzeile with Hofberg

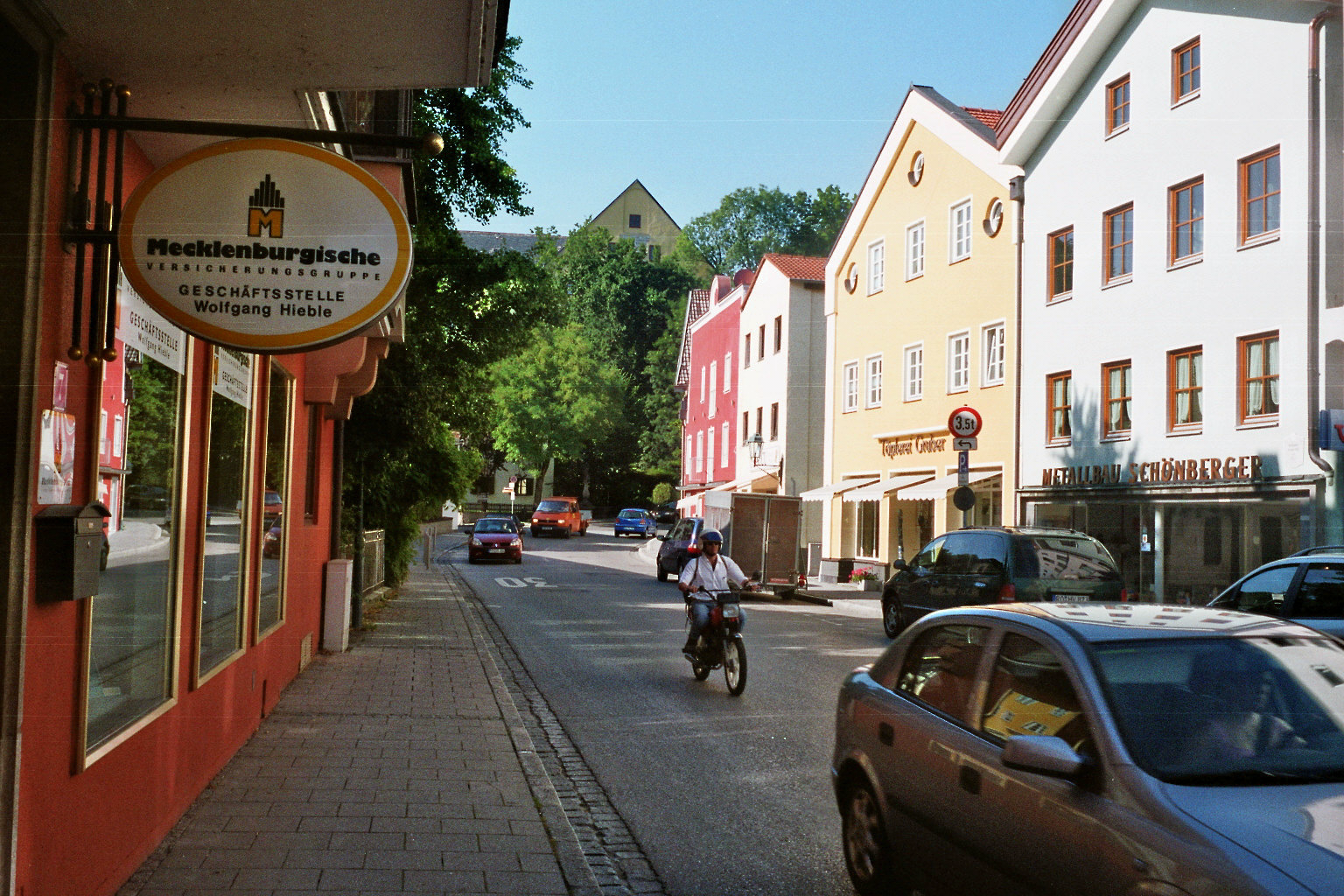
Obere Kirchzeile

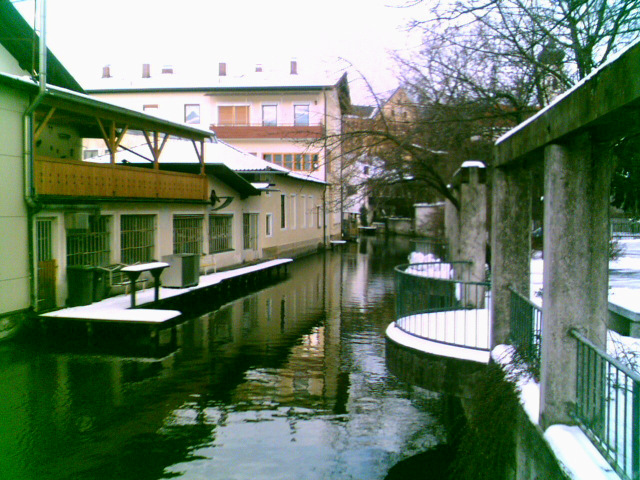
"Klein Venedig" (Little Venice)

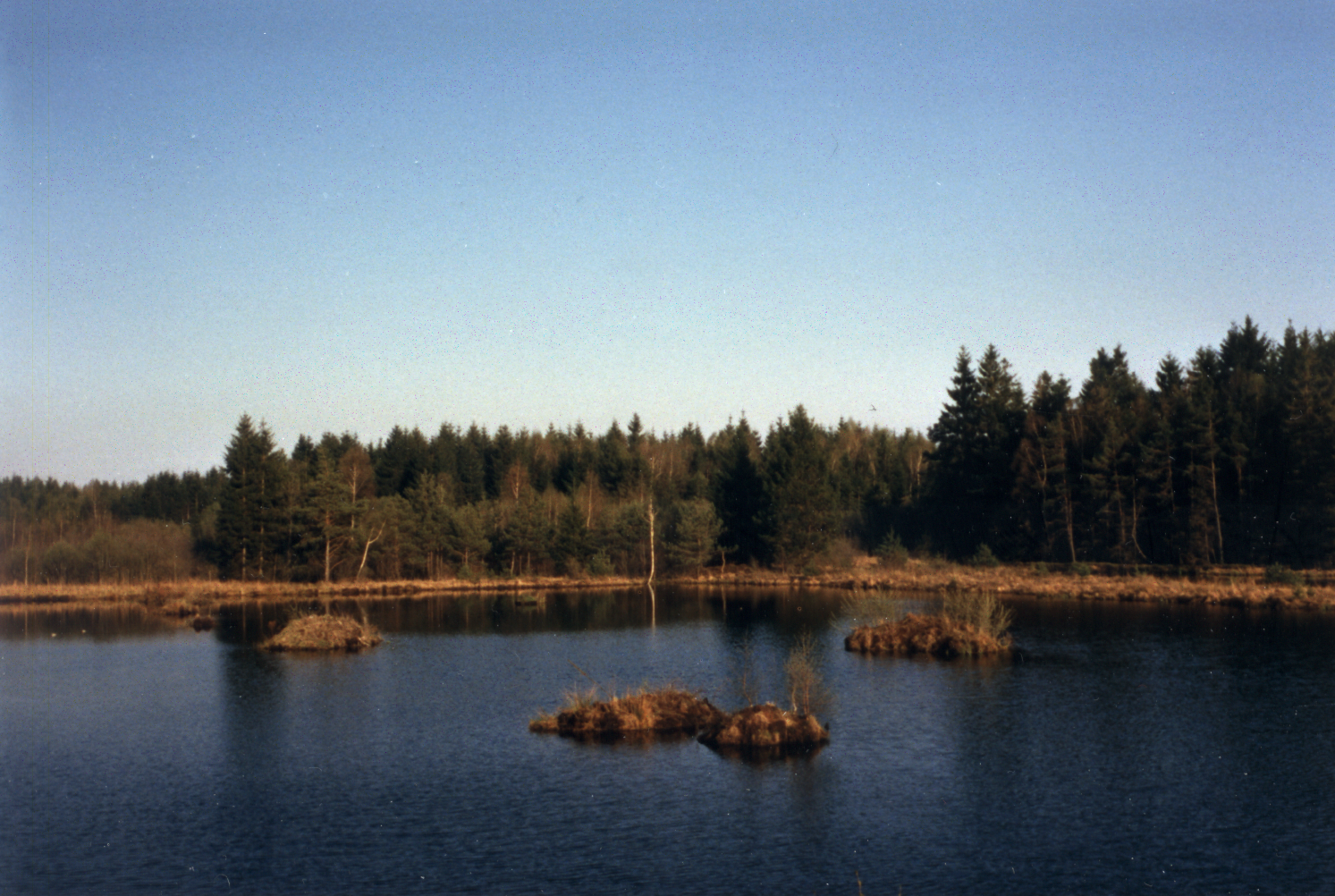
Peat mining in the Schuhbräu-Filze

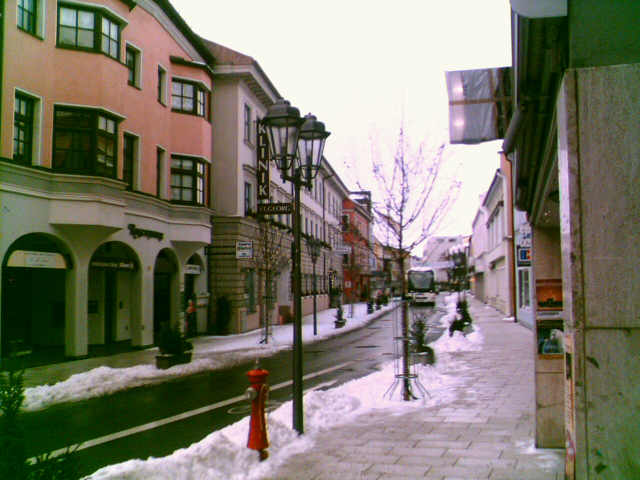
Inner Rosenheimer Straße

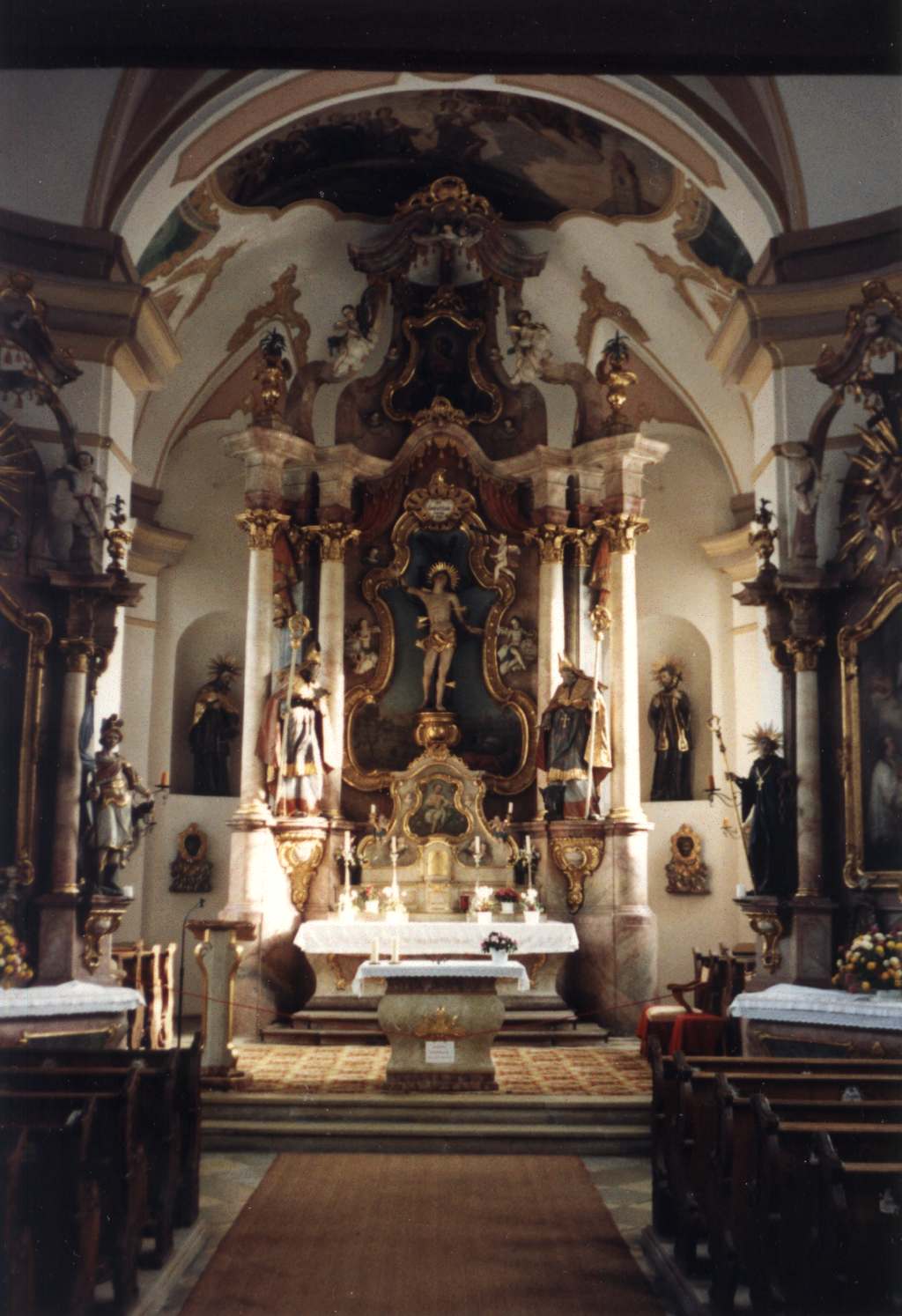
St. Sebastian's church

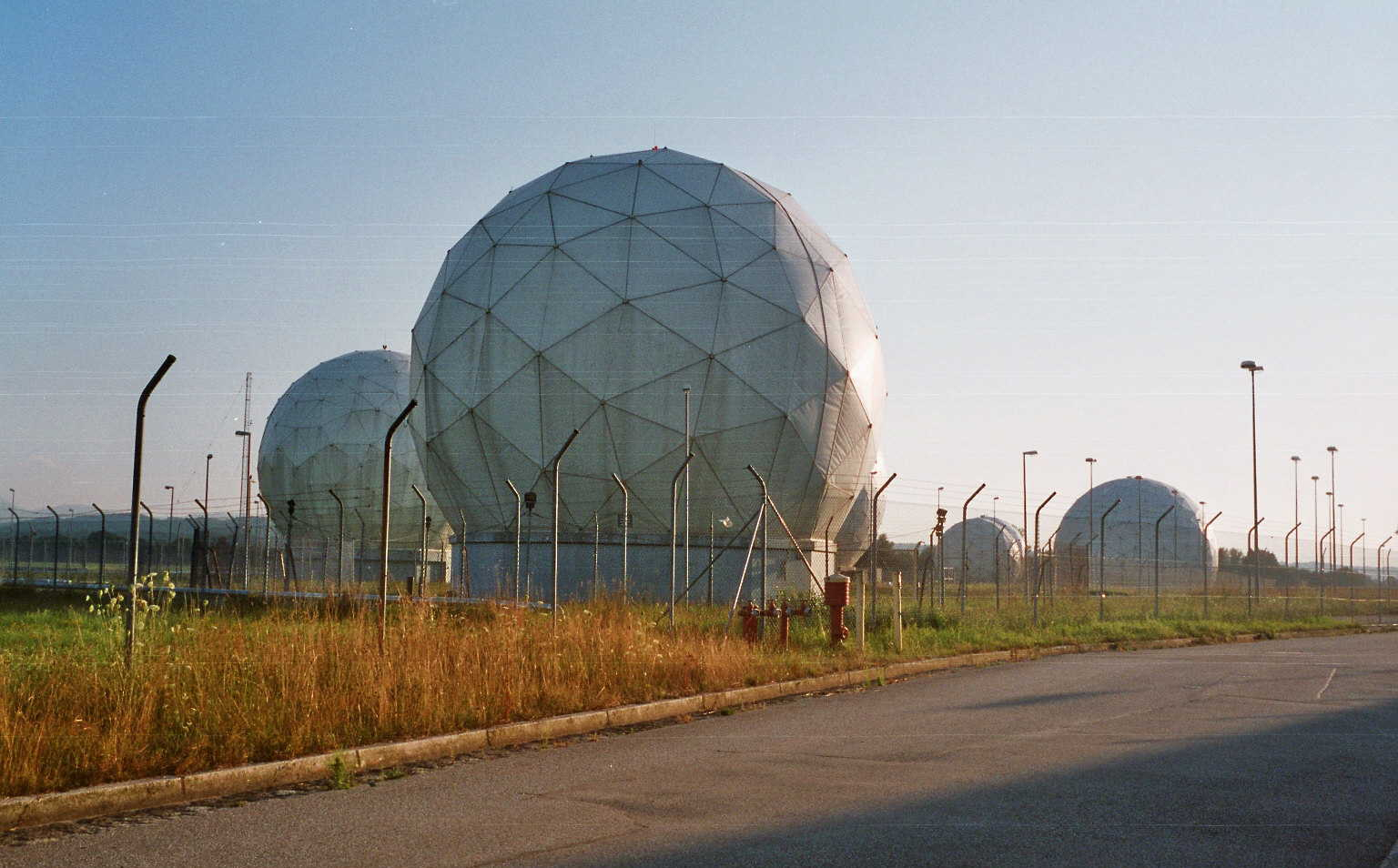
ECHELON station

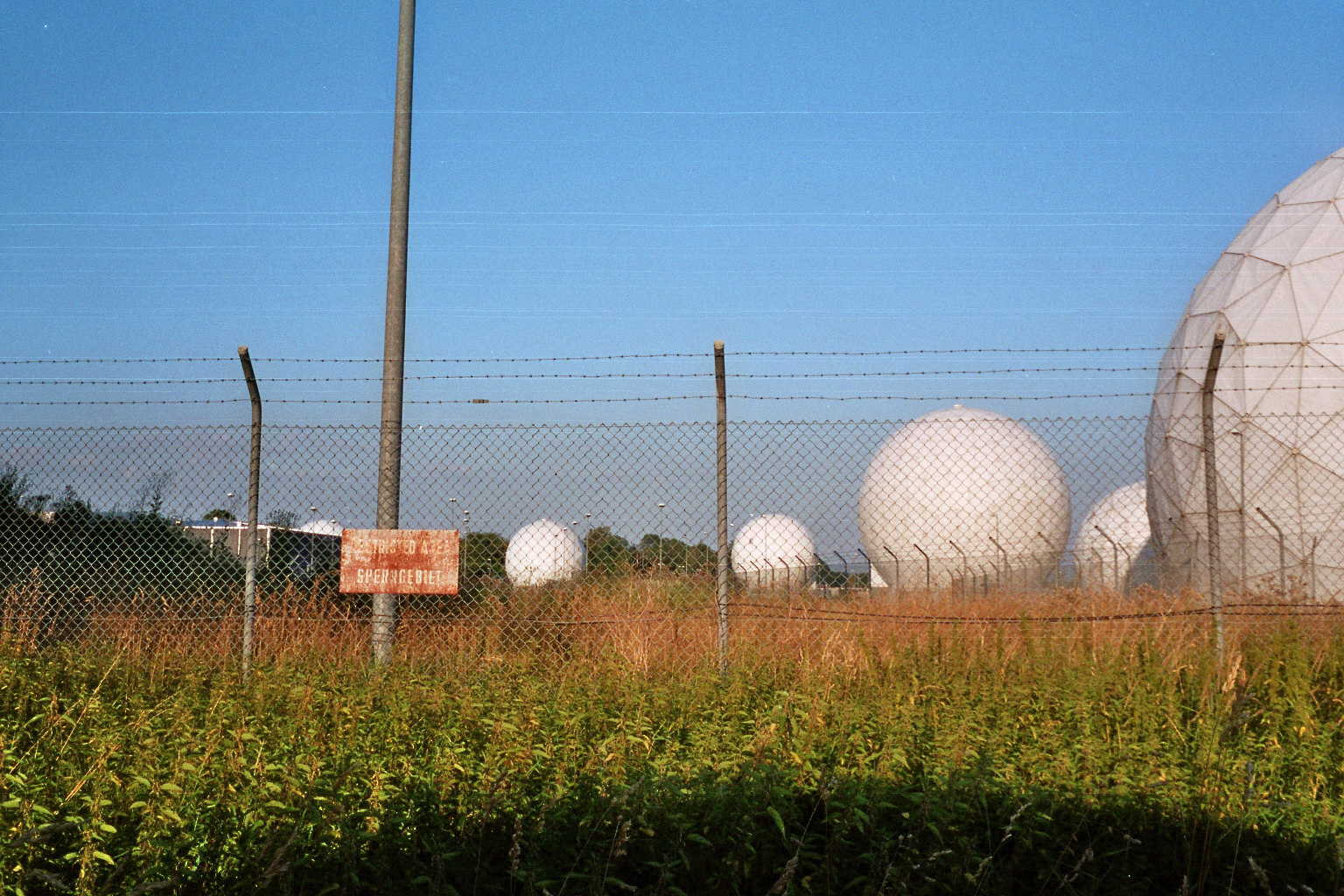
ECHELON station

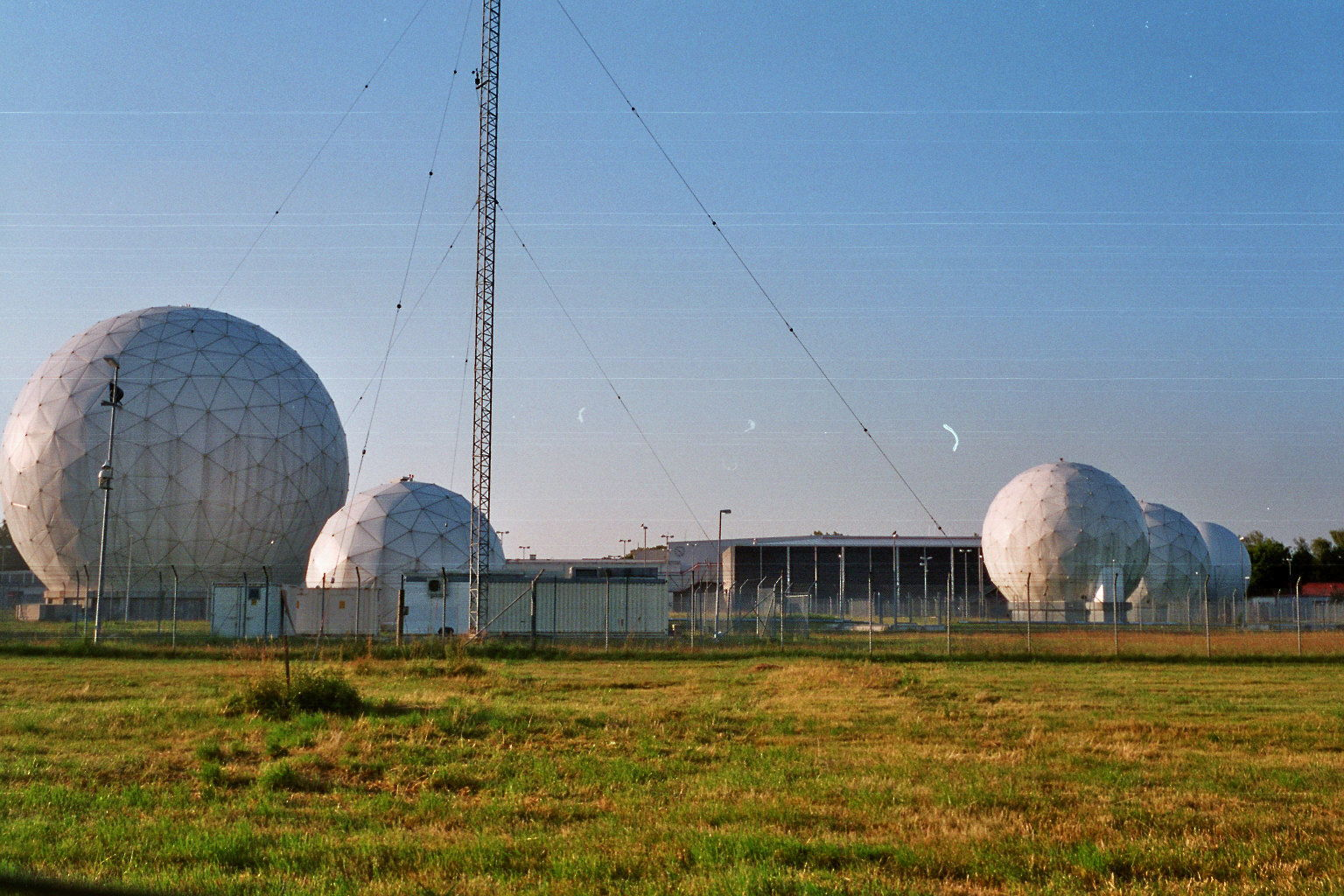
ECHELON station

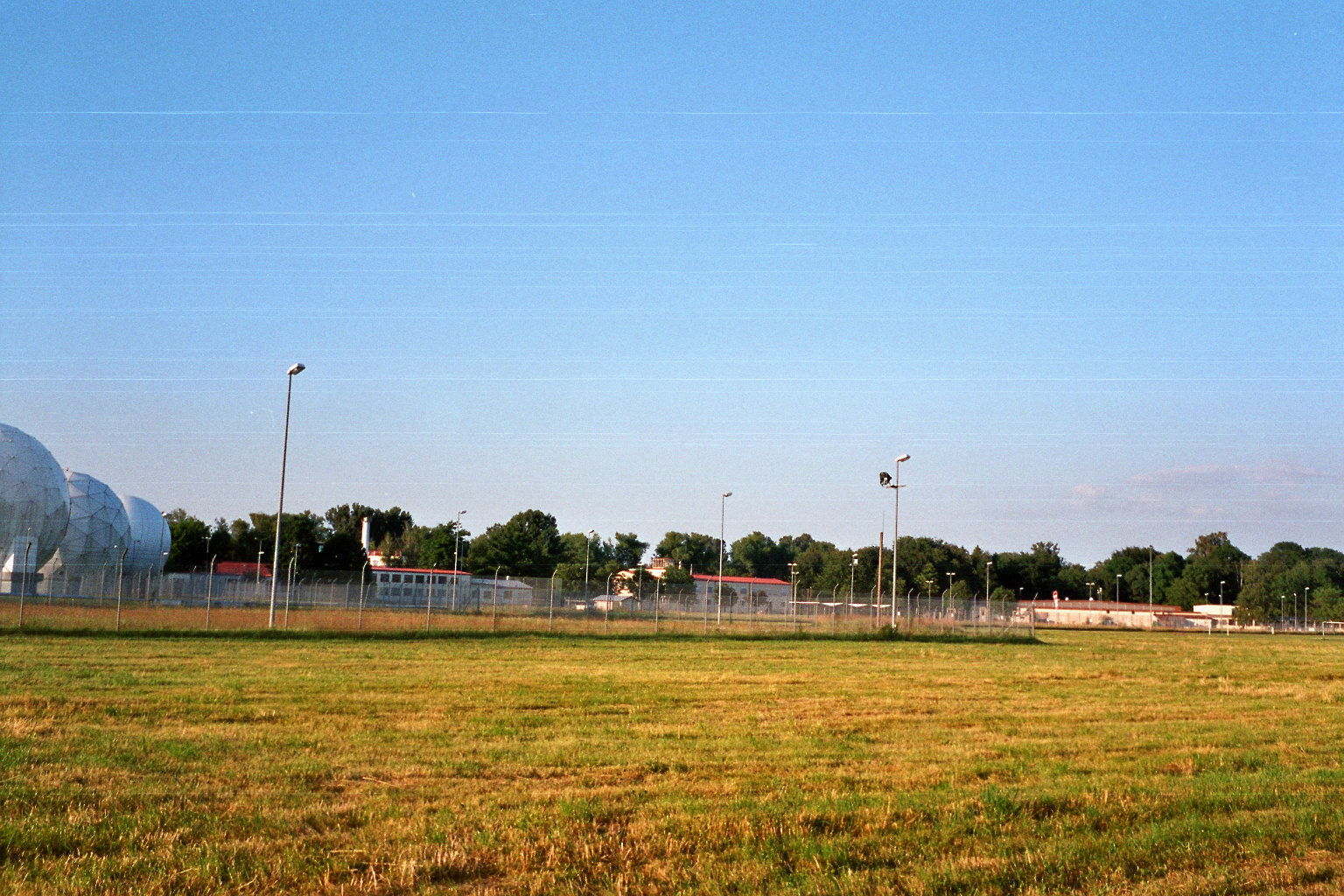
ECHELON station

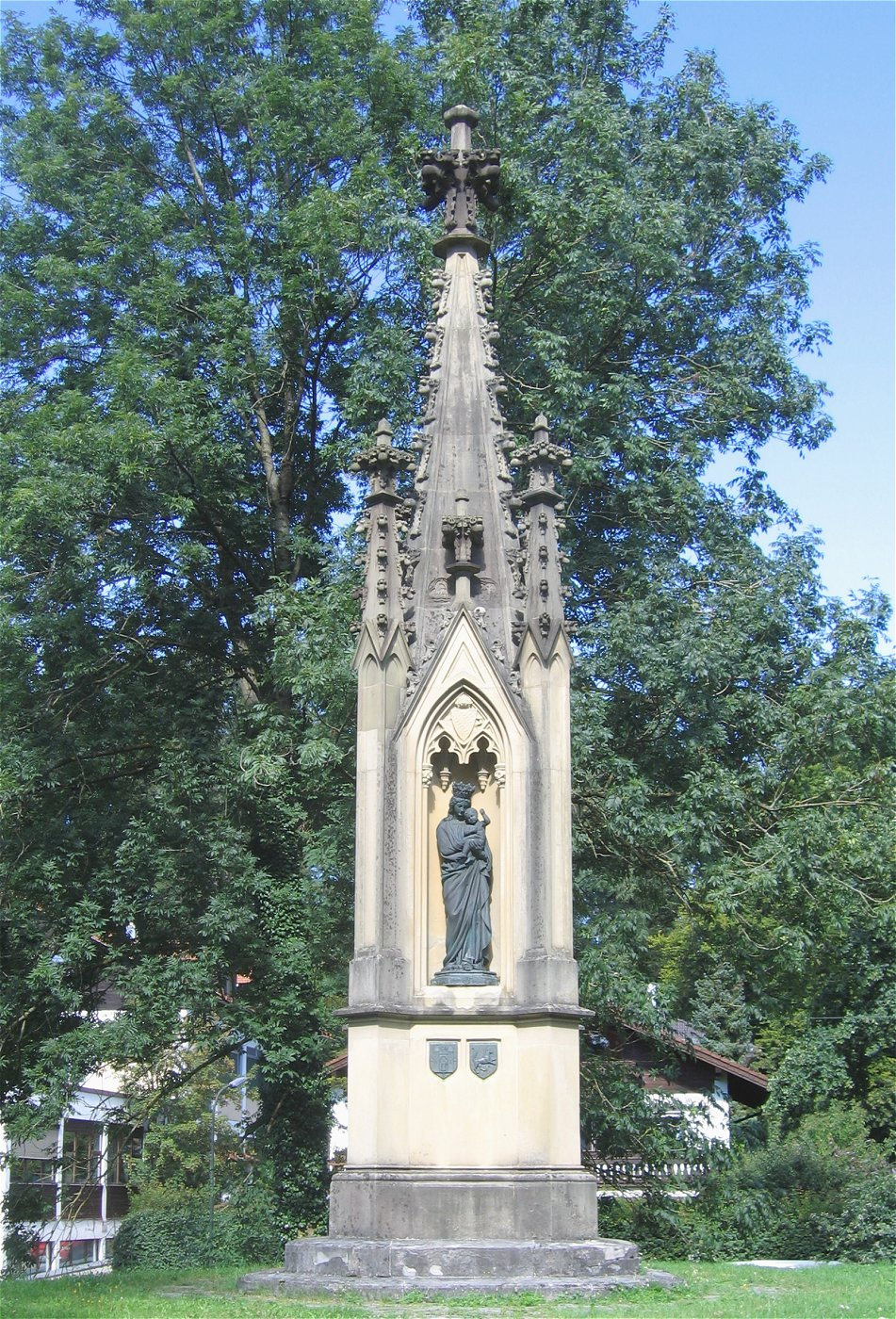
Theresienmonument

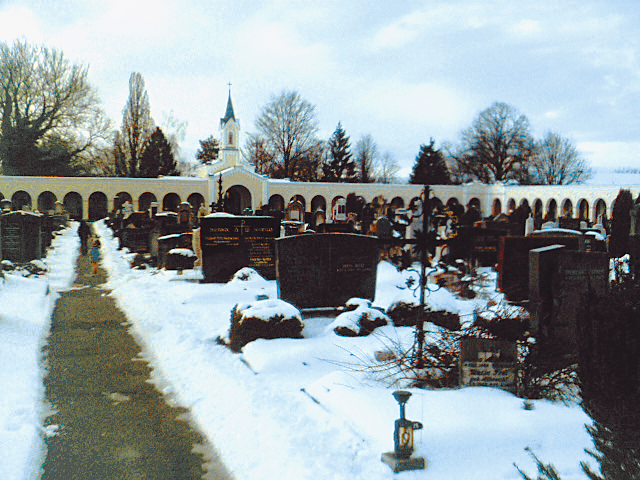
Italian style central cemetery

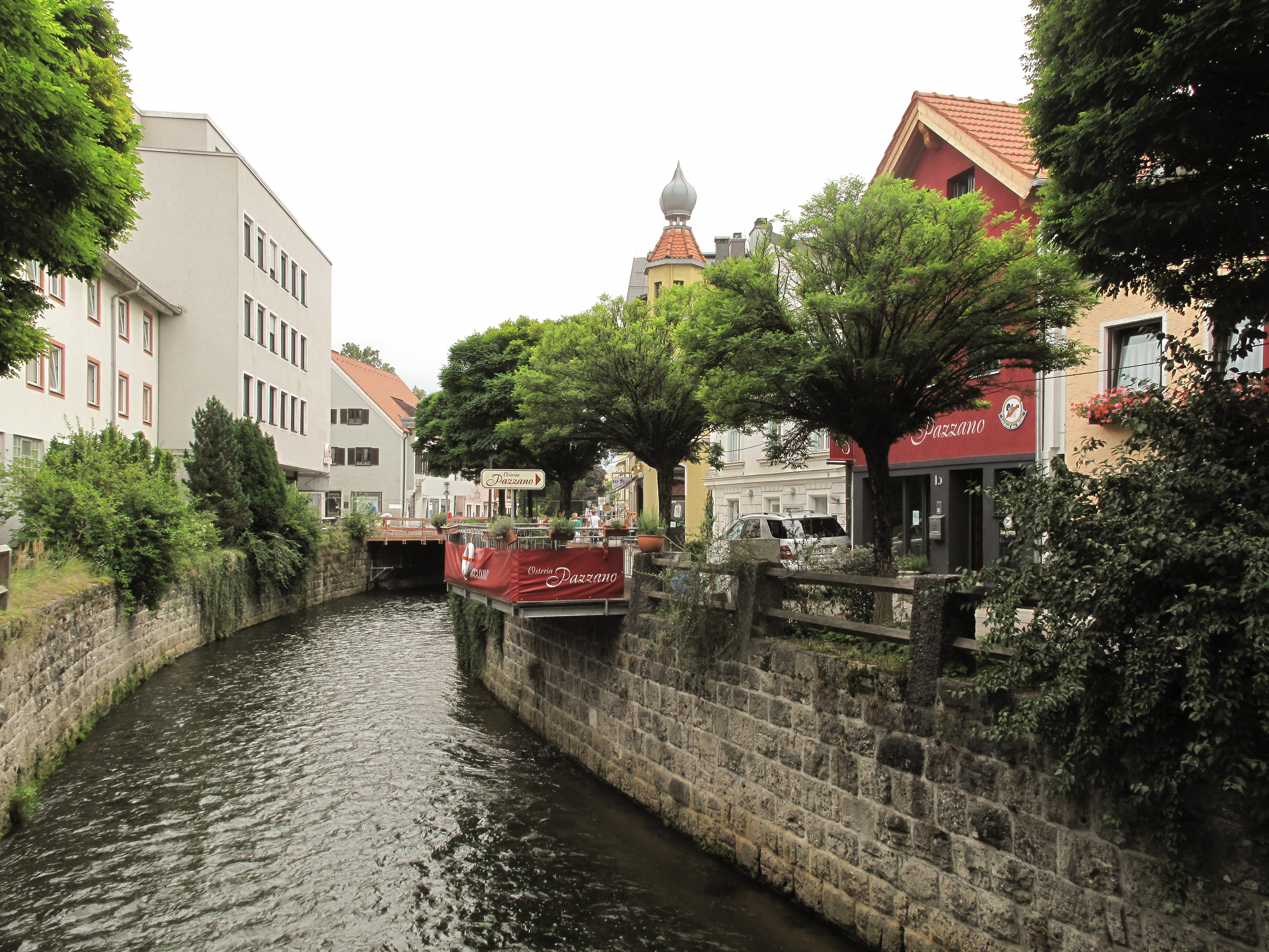
Water through the town

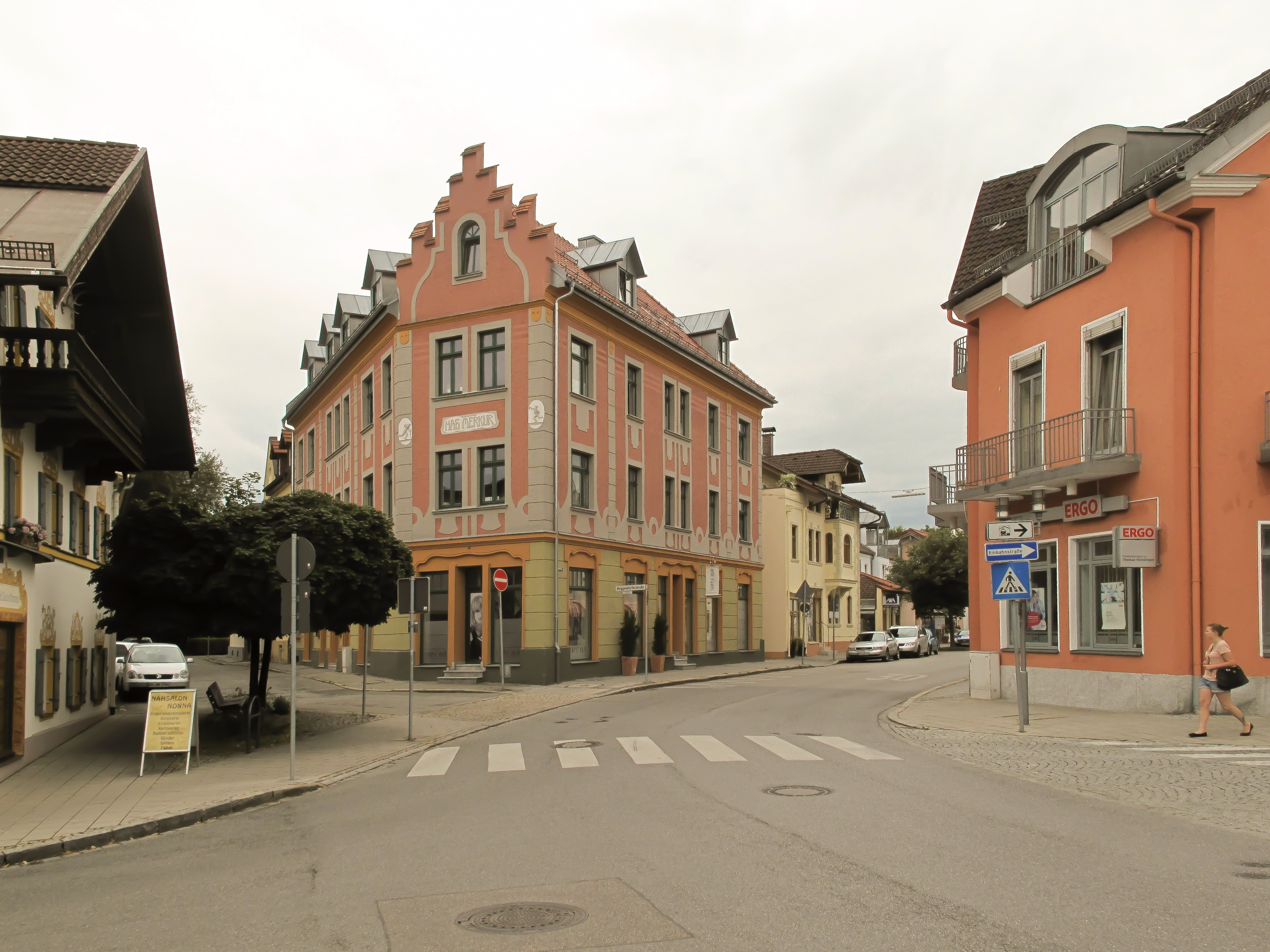
Bahnhofstrasse-Sedanstrasse

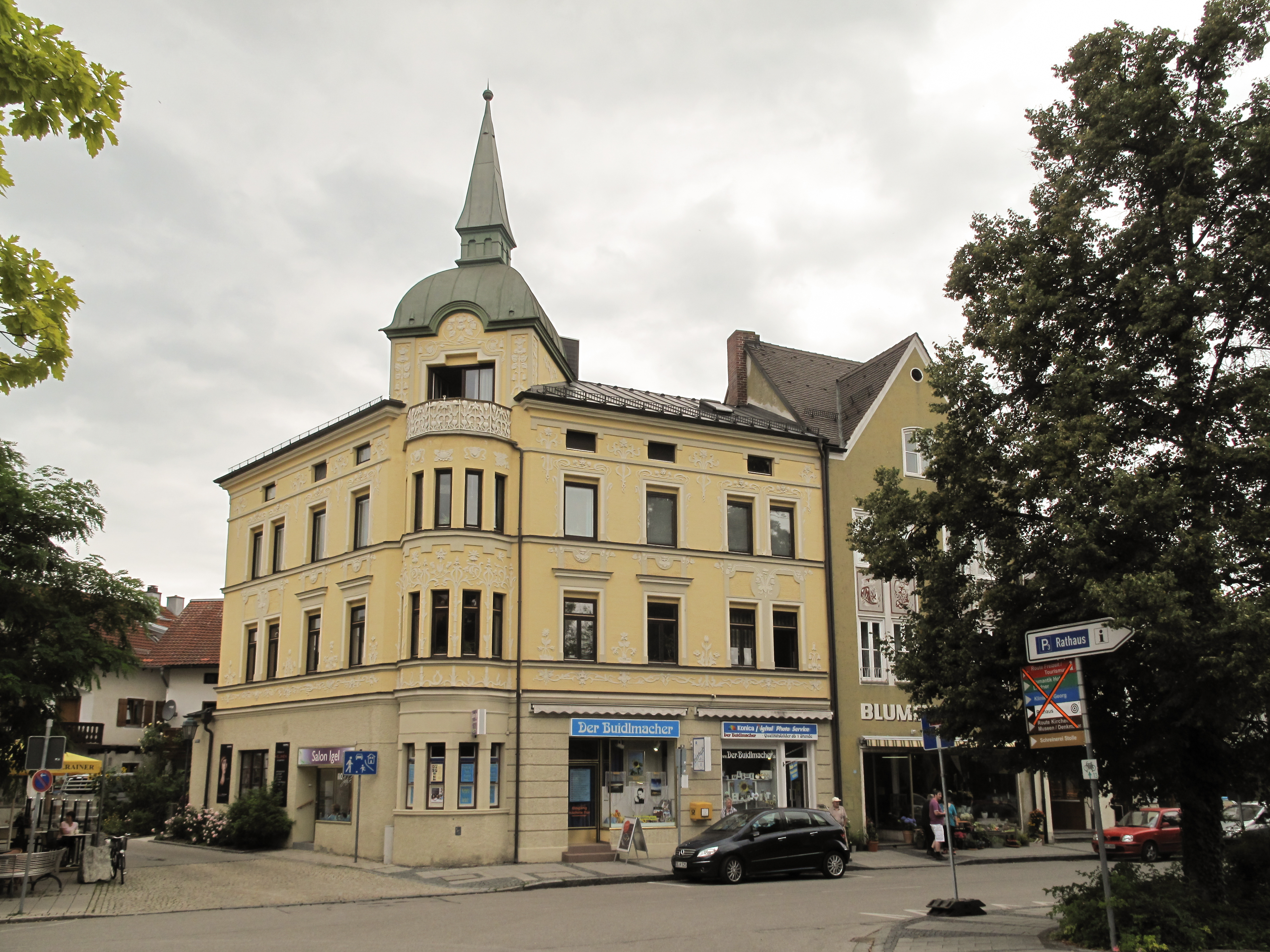
View to a street: die Bahnhofstrasse

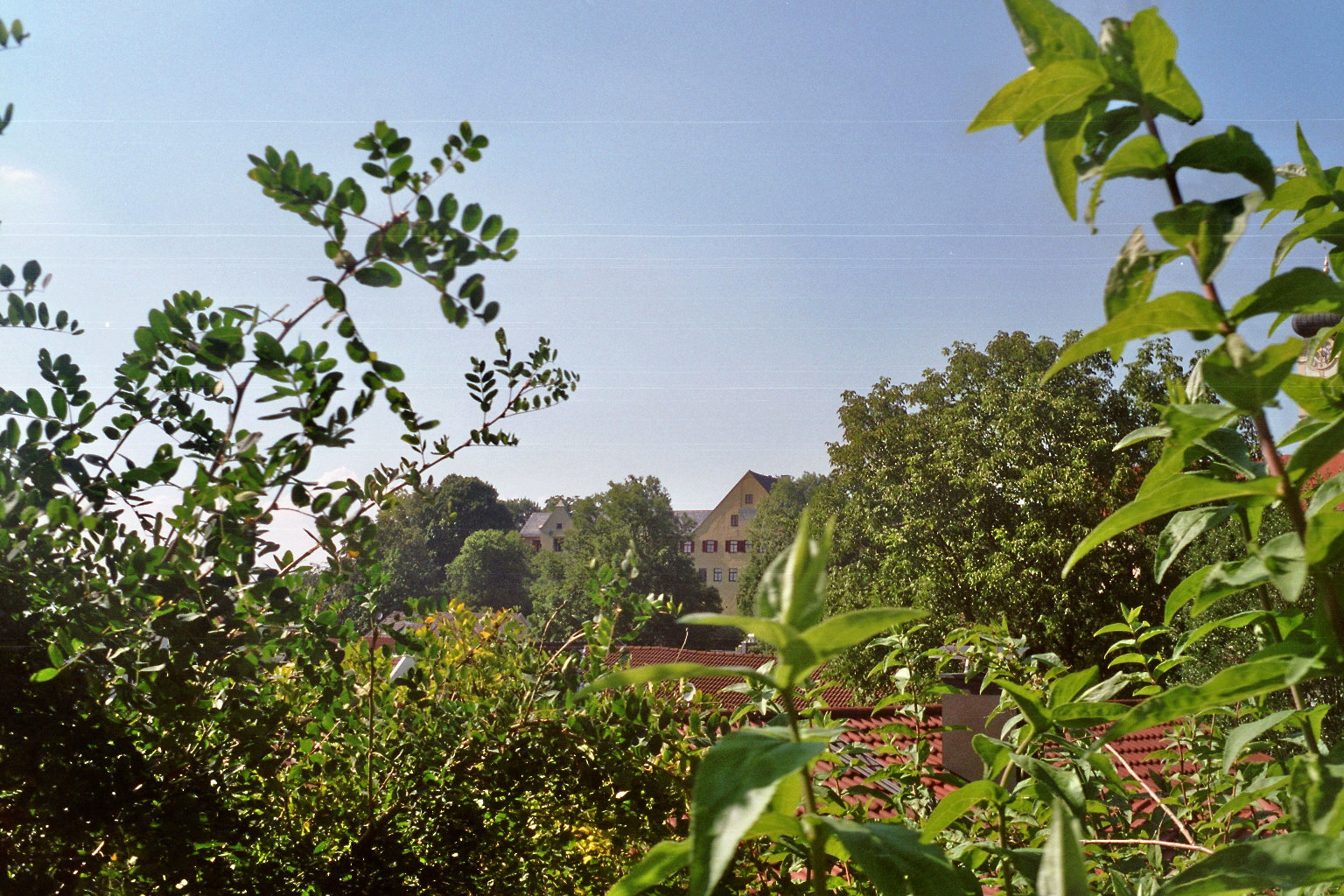
View from the Klafferer to Hofberg

== Economy and infrastructure ==
In Bad Aibling, there are several large spa hotels and rehabilitation hospitals that rely on peat pulp as a basic treatment. Additionally, in 2007 the new thermae were opened.

=== Companies based in Bad Aibling ===
Several companies in the pharmaceutical industry, textile manufacturing, electrical engineering, plastics manufacturing, and dairy processing are located in Bad Aibling.

=== Administration and public institutions ===
- Municipal institutions
- Employment office Bad Aibling
- Institutions of the Rosenheim district office (veterinary office, motor vehicle registration authority)
- Local court
- Bundesnachrichtendienst (BND), Federal Intelligence Service

=== Mayors ===
Period of office	1. Mayor	2. Mayor	3. Mayor
1947–1948	Wunnibald Sedlmeier (CSU)	Michael Scherer (CSU)	–
1948–1952	Wunnibald Sedlmeier (CSU)	Josef Matheis (CSU)	–
1952–1956	Josef Matheis (CSU)	Michael Scherer (CSU)	–
1956–1960	Max Falter (SPD)	Dr. Wolfgang Kessler (CSU)	–
1960–1966	Max Falter (SPD)	Ferdinand Arnold (CSU)	–
1966–1968	Max Falter (SPD)	Michael Scherer (CSU)	–
1968	Michael Scherer (CSU)	–	–
1968–1974	Hans Falter (SPD)	Michael Scherer (CSU)	–
1974–1984	Josef Riedl (CSU)	Konrad Gartmeier (CSU)	–
1984–1985	Josef Riedl (CSU)	Anton Müller (CSU)	–
1985–1986	Josef Riedl (CSU)	Felix Schwaller (CSU)	–
1986–1990	Werner Keitz (SPD)	Felix Schwaller (CSU)	–
1990–2002	Werner Keitz (SPD)	Felix Schwaller (CSU)	Meinrad Egger (ÜWG)
2002–2008	Felix Schwaller (CSU)	Roland Fortner (CSU)	Rudi Gebhart (ÜWG)
2008–2014	Felix Schwaller (CSU)	Heidi Benda (Grüne)	Otto Steffl (CSU)
2014–2016	Felix Schwaller (CSU)	Otto Steffl (CSU)	Kristin Sauter (SPD)
2016–	Felix Schwaller (CSU)	–	Kristin Sauter (SPD)

=== Education ===
- German football boarding school (Deutsches Fußballinternat Bad Aibling)
- Gymnasium Bad Aibling (high school for secondary education)
- Wilhelm-Leibl-Realschule (secondary school)
- Wirtschaftsschule Alpenland (secondary school for economics)
- Grund- und Hauptschulen (primary and secondary education)
- Sonderschule (primary and secondary education for children with special needs)
- Volkshochschule Bad Aibling (adult evening classes)

=== Number of inhabitants ===
- 1840: 2,597
- 1871: 3,479
- 1900: 5,181
- 1925: 6,218
- 1939: 7,764
- 1950: 10,908
- 1961: 9,991
- 1970: 10,860
- 1987: 12,583 (census)
- 2000: 16,437
- 2010: 18,272
- 2015: 18,408

== Culture and attractions ==
=== Echelon festival ===
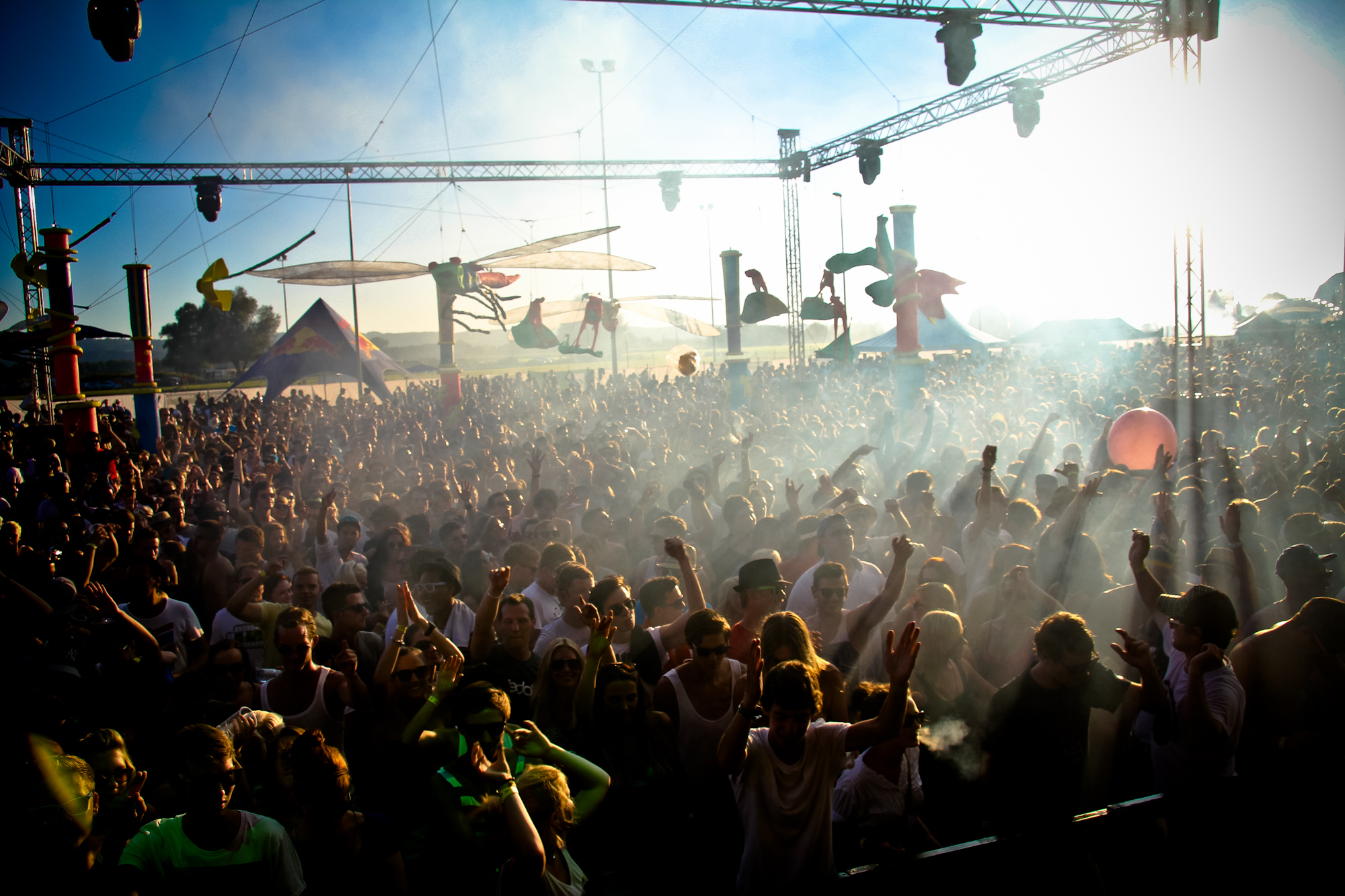
The Echelon festival in the year 2012

The Echelon Open Air & Indoor Festival is an electro-, techno and house-festival that has taken place in Bad Aibling annually in August since 2009. With about 25,000 visitors in 2015 it is the largest festival of its kind in Bavaria. It is located on the abandoned Bad Aibling Station which was used for the festival's eponymous global surveillance network ECHELON.

== Twin town ==
Bad Aibling has been twinned with

- Cavaion Veronese, Italy, since 2006.

== People affiliated with Bad Aibling ==
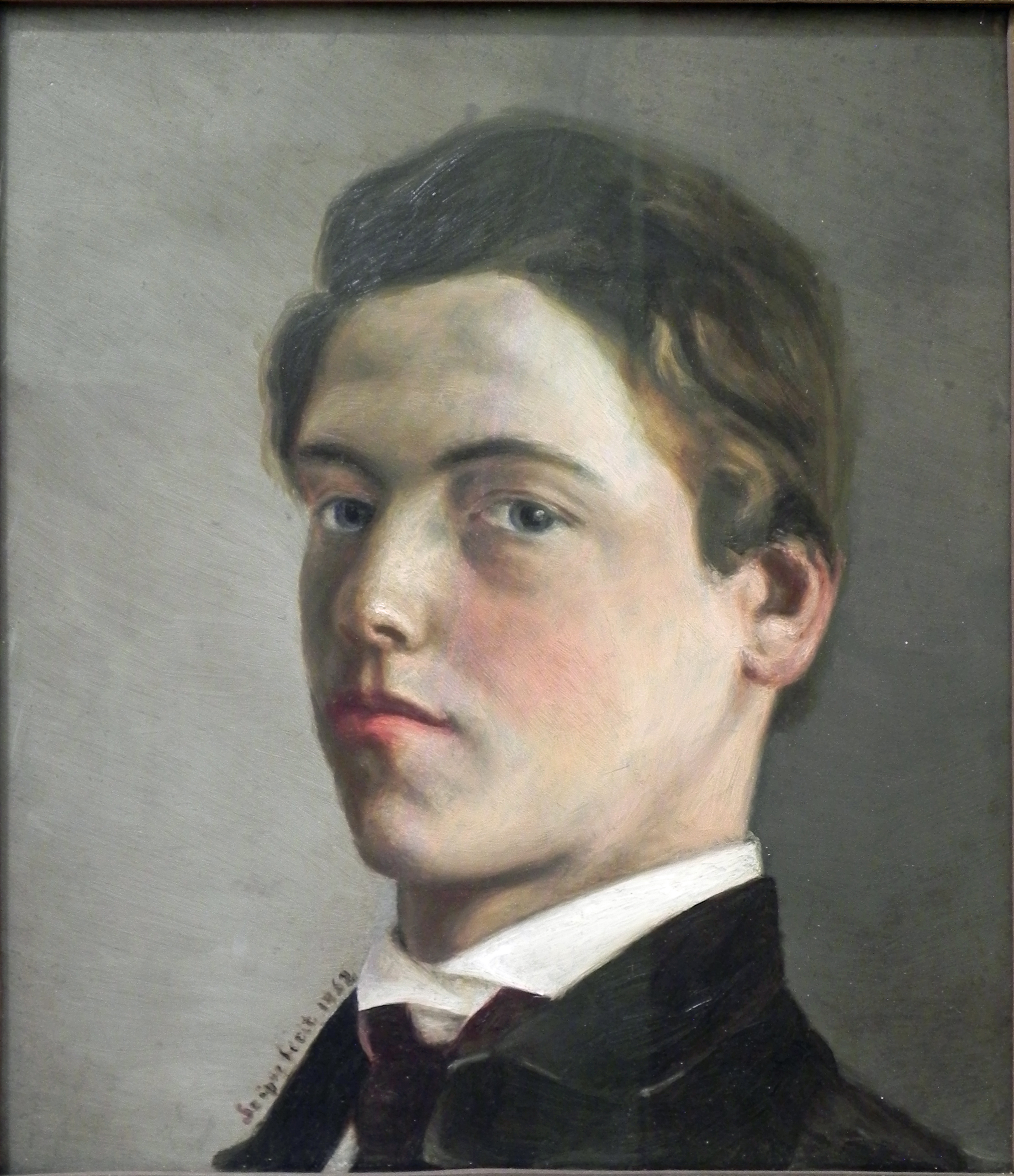
Wilhelm Leibl Self-portrait at the age of 18

- Eleonore Baur – (1885–1981), also known as "Sister Pia", a war criminal of the National Socialist era
- Desiderius Beck – (c. 1804–c. 1877), was a Bavarian court physician. In 1845, he opened the first Bavarian brine and peat mud baths in Bad Aibling in Rose Street, later Ludwig bathroom.
- Käthe Bierbaumer – (1884–?), Patron of the Thule Society and funder of Adolf Hitler
- Eduard Dietl – (1890–1944), German general of World War II
- Amelie Kober – (born 1987), German Federal Police officer and Olympic medalist in snowboarding
- Wilhelm Leibl – (1844–1900), German realist painter of portraits and scenes of peasant life
- Johann Sperl – (1840–1914), German painter
- Friedrich Meggendorfer – (1880–1953), German psychiatrist and neurologist
- Joseph Maximilian von Maillinger (1820–1901), General of Infantry of Bavarian Army
- Franz Osten (1876–1956), German film director, who lived after the Second World War in the town
- Klaus Wennemann (1940–2000), actor
- Julian Weigl – (born 1995), German footballer for Sport Lisboa e Benfica
