= List of painters in the Pinakothek =

The List of painters in the Pinakothek is a list of the named artists in the Bavarian State Picture Collection whose works are in the collections of the Alte Pinakothek, Neue Pinakothek, or Pinakothek der Moderne. The list contains roughly 225 artists, but only named painters are listed alphabetically here. The artist's name is followed by the location(s) of their works. Of artists listed, there are only 4 women, including Angelica Kauffman, Rachel Ruysch, Teresa Hubbard of the artist duo Teresa Hubbard / Alexander Birchler, and Marie-Gabrielle Capet. For the complete list of artists and their artworks in the collection, see the website.

- Andreas Achenbach (1815–1910), Neue Pinakothek
- Albrecht Altdorfer (1480–1538), Alte Pinakothek
- Friedrich von Amerling (1803–1887), Neue Pinakothek
- Fra Angelico (1387–1455), Alte Pinakothek
- Gabriel Angler (1405–1462), Alte Pinakothek
- Balthasar van der Ast (1593–1656), Alte Pinakothek
- Hans Baldung (1484–1545), Alte Pinakothek
- Federico Barocci (1530–1612), Alte Pinakothek
- Georg Baselitz (b.1938), Pinakothek der Moderne
- Max Beckmann (1884–1950), Pinakothek der Moderne
- Joseph Beuys (1921–1986), Pinakothek der Moderne, Neue Pinakothek
- Carl Blechen (1797–1840), Neue Pinakothek
- Karl Blossfeldt (1865–1932), Neue Pinakothek
- Arnold Böcklin (1827–1901), Neue Pinakothek
- Pierre Bonnard (1867–1947), Neue Pinakothek
- Sandro Botticelli (1444–1510), Neue Pinakothek
- François Boucher (1703–1770), Alte Pinakothek
- Sébastien Bourdon (1616–1671), Alte Pinakothek
- Dieric Bouts (1415–1475), Alte Pinakothek
- Adriaen Brouwer (1605–1638), Alte Pinakothek
- Pieter Bruegel the Elder (1526–1569), Alte Pinakothek
- Jan Brueghel the Elder (1568–1624), Alte Pinakothek
- Hans Burgkmair (1473–1540), Alte Pinakothek
- Heinrich Bürkel (1802–1869), Neue Pinakothek
- Antonio Canova (1757–1822), Neue Pinakothek
- Marie-Gabrielle Capet (1761–1818), Neue Pinakothek
- Franz Ludwig Catel (1778–1856), Neue Pinakothek
- Paul Cézanne (1839–1906), Neue Pinakothek
- John Chamberlain (sculptor) (1927–2011), Pinakothek der Moderne
- Jean-Baptiste-Siméon Chardin (1699–1779), Alte Pinakothek
- Cima da Conegliano (ca. 1459–1517/18), Alte Pinakothek
- John Constable (1776–1837), Neue Pinakothek
- Lovis Corinth (1858–1925), Neue Pinakothek
- Peter Cornelius (1783–1867), Neue Pinakothek
- Gustave Courbet (1819–1877), Neue Pinakothek
- Lucas Cranach the Elder (1472–1553), Alte Pinakothek
- Leonardo da Vinci (1452–1519), Alte Pinakothek
- Johan Christian Dahl (1788–1857), Neue Pinakothek
- Cornelis van Dalem (1530–1576), Alte Pinakothek
- Honoré Daumier (1808–1879), Neue Pinakothek
- Gerard David (1460–1523), Alte Pinakothek
- Jacques-Louis David (1748–1825), Neue Pinakothek
- Franz von Defregger (1835–1921), Neue Pinakothek
- Edgar Degas (1834–1917), Neue Pinakothek
- Eugène Delacroix (1798–1863), Neue Pinakothek
- Robert Delaunay (1885–1941), Pinakothek der Moderne
- Johann Georg von Dillis (1759–1841), Neue Pinakothek
- Albrecht Dürer (1471–1528), Alte Pinakothek
- Anthony van Dyck (1599–1641), Alte Pinakothek
- Johann Georg Edlinger (1741–1819), Neue Pinakothek
- Adam Elsheimer (1578–1610), Alte Pinakothek
- James Ensor (1860–1949), Neue Pinakothek
- Max Ernst (1891–1976), Pinakothek der Moderne
- Carel Fabritius (1622–1654), Alte Pinakothek
- Anselm Feuerbach (1829–1880), Neue Pinakothek
- Dan Flavin (1933–1996), Pinakothek der Moderne
- Frans Francken the Younger (1581–1642), Alte Pinakothek
- Caspar David Friedrich (1774–1840), Neue Pinakothek
- Ernst Fries (1801–1833), Neue Pinakothek
- Thomas Gainsborough (1727–1788), Neue Pinakothek
- Louis Gallait (1810–1887), Neue Pinakothek
- Paul Gauguin (1848–1903), Neue Pinakothek
- Orazio Gentileschi (1563–1639), Alte Pinakothek
- Théodore Géricault (1791–1824), Neue Pinakothek
- Domenico Ghirlandaio (1449–1494), Alte Pinakothek
- Giotto (1266–1337), Alte Pinakothek
- Vincent van Gogh (1853–1890), Neue Pinakothek
- Hendrik Goltzius (1558–1617), Alte Pinakothek
- Jan Gossaert (1478–1532), Alte Pinakothek
- Francisco Goya (1746–1828), Neue Pinakothek
- Anton Graff (1736–1813), Neue Pinakothek
- El Greco (1541–1614), Alte Pinakothek
- George Grosz (1893–1959), Pinakothek der Moderne
- Matthias Grünewald (1470/80-1528), Alte Pinakothek
- Francesco Guardi (1712–1793), Alte Pinakothek
- Wade Guyton (b.1972), Neue Pinakothek
- Jacob Philipp Hackert (1737–1807), Neue Pinakothek
- Frans Hals (1582–1666), Alte Pinakothek
- Johann Peter Hasenclever (1810–1853), Neue Pinakothek
- Heinrich Maria von Hess (1798–1863), Neue Pinakothek
- Peter von Hess (1792–1871), Neue Pinakothek
- Rudolf Hirth du Frênes (1846–1916), Neue Pinakothek
- Ferdinand Hodler (1853–1918), Neue Pinakothek
- Karl Hofer (1878–1955), Pinakothek der Moderne
- Ludwig von Hofmann (1861–1945), Neue Pinakothek
- Hans Holbein the Elder (1460–1524), Alte Pinakothek
- Teresa Hubbard / Alexander Birchler (b. 1962 & 1965), Neue Pinakothek
- Abraham Janssens (1570–1632), Alte Pinakothek
- Jacob Jordaens (1593–1678), Alte Pinakothek
- Willem Kalf (1619–1693), Alte Pinakothek
- Wassily Kandinsky (1866–1944), Pinakothek der Moderne
- Angelica Kauffman (1741–1807), Neue Pinakothek
- Wilhelm von Kaulbach (1804–1874), Neue Pinakothek
- Albert von Keller (1844/1845–1920), Neue Pinakothek
- Georg Friedrich Kersting (1785–1847), Neue Pinakothek
- Ernst Ludwig Kirchner (1880–1938), Neue Pinakothek
- Leo von Klenze (1784–1864), Neue Pinakothek
- Gustav Klimt (1862–1918), Neue Pinakothek
- Max Klinger (1857–1920), Neue Pinakothek
- Wilhelm von Kobell (1766–1853), Neue Pinakothek
- Joseph Anton Koch (1768–1839), Neue Pinakothek
- Philips Koninck (1619–1688), Alte Pinakothek
- Willem de Kooning (1904–1997), Pinakothek der Moderne
- Nicolas Lancret (1690–1743), Alte Pinakothek
- Pieter Lastman (1583–1633), Alte Pinakothek
- Thomas Lawrence (1769–1830), Neue Pinakothek
- Wilhelm Leibl (1844–1900), Neue Pinakothek
- Franz von Lenbach (1836–1904), Neue Pinakothek
- Lucas van Leyden (1494–1533), Alte Pinakothek
- Max Liebermann (1847–1935), Neue Pinakothek
- Adolf Heinrich Lier (1826–1882), Neue Pinakothek
- Filippo Lippi (1406–1469), Alte Pinakothek
- Johann Liss (1590–1629), Alte Pinakothek
- Stefan Lochner (c. 1400–1451), Alte Pinakothek, Neue Pinakothek
- Claude Lorrain (1604–1682), Alte Pinakothek
- Lorenzo Lotto (1480–1556), Alte Pinakothek
- August Macke (1887–1914), Pinakothek der Moderne
- René Magritte (1898–1967), Pinakothek der Moderne
- Aristide Maillol (1861–1944), Neue Pinakothek
- Hans Makart (1840–1884), Neue Pinakothek
- Édouard Manet (1832–1883), Neue Pinakothek
- Hans von Marées (1837–1887), Neue Pinakothek
- Jacob Maris (1837–1899), Neue Pinakothek
- Willem Maris (1844–1910), Neue Pinakothek
- Masolino da Panicale (1383–1447), Alte Pinakothek
- Henri Matisse (1869–1954), Pinakothek der Moderne
- Gabriel Cornelius von Max (1840–1915), Neue Pinakothek
- Eduard van der Meer (1846–1889), Neue Pinakothek
- Master of Saint Veronica (1400–1420), Alte Pinakothek
- Master of the Saint Bartholomew Altarpiece (1465–1510), Alte Pinakothek
- Hans Memling (1430–1494), Alte Pinakothek
- Lippo Memmi (1291–1356), Alte Pinakothek
- Adolph Menzel (1815–1905), Neue Pinakothek
- Jean-François Millet (1814–1875), Neue Pinakothek
- Claude Monet (1840–1926), Neue Pinakothek
- Bartolomé Esteban Murillo (1617–1682), Alte Pinakothek
- François-Joseph Navez (1787–1869), Neue Pinakothek
- Emil Nolde (1867–1956), Pinakothek der Moderne
- Ferdinand Olivier (1785–1841), Neue Pinakothek
- Friedrich Overbeck (1789–1869), Neue Pinakothek
- Michael Pacher (c. 1435–1498), Alte Pinakothek
- Blinky Palermo (1943–1977), Pinakothek der Moderne
- Juan Pantoja de la Cruz (1553–1608), Alte Pinakothek
- Parmigianino (1503–1540), Alte Pinakothek
- Pablo Picasso (1881–1973), Neue Pinakothek, Pinakothek der Moderne
- Karl von Piloty (1826–1886), Neue Pinakothek
- Frans Post (1612–1680), Alte Pinakothek
- Nicolas Poussin (1594–1665), Alte Pinakothek
- Domenico Quaglio the Younger (1787–1837), Neue Pinakothek
- Arthur von Ramberg (1819–1875), Neue Pinakothek
- Raphael (1483–1520), Alte Pinakothek
- Ferdinand von Rayski (1806–1890), Neue Pinakothek
- Josef Rebell (1787–1828), Neue Pinakothek
- Johann Christian Reinhart (1761–1847), Neue Pinakothek
- Rembrandt (1606–1669), Alte Pinakothek
- Guido Reni (1575–1642), Alte Pinakothek
- Pierre-Auguste Renoir (1841–1919), Neue Pinakothek
- Joshua Reynolds (1723–1792), Neue Pinakothek
- Adrian Ludwig Richter (1803–1884), Neue Pinakothek
- August Riedel (1799–1883), Neue Pinakothek
- Auguste Rodin (1840–1917), Neue Pinakothek
- Johann Martin von Rohden (1778–1868), Neue Pinakothek
- Carl Rottmann (1798–1850), Neue Pinakothek
- Peter Paul Rubens (1577–1640), Alte Pinakothek
- Jacob Isaacksz van Ruisdael (1628–1682), Alte Pinakothek
- Philipp Otto Runge (1777–1810), Neue Pinakothek
- Rachel Ruysch (1664–1750), Alte Pinakothek
- Théo van Rysselberghe (1862–1926), Neue Pinakothek
- Pieter Jansz. Saenredam (1597–1665), Alte Pinakothek
- Carlo Saraceni (1579–1620), Alte Pinakothek
- Friedrich Wilhelm Schadow (1789–1862), Neue Pinakothek
- Ridolfo Schadow (1786–1822), Neue Pinakothek
- Egon Schiele (1890–1918), Neue Pinakothek
- Karl Friedrich Schinkel (1781–1841), Neue Pinakothek
- Eduard Schleich the Elder (1812–1874), Neue Pinakothek
- Oskar Schlemmer (1888–1943), Pinakothek der Moderne
- Martin Schongauer (1440–1491), Alte Pinakothek
- Carl Schuch (1846–1902), Neue Pinakothek
- Moritz von Schwind (1804–1871), Neue Pinakothek
- Jan Siberechts (1627–1703), Alte Pinakothek
- Luca Signorelli (1441–1523), Alte Pinakothek
- Max Slevogt (1868–1932), Neue Pinakothek
- Johann Sperl (1840–1914), Neue Pinakothek
- Carl Spitzweg (1808–1885), Neue Pinakothek
- Joseph Karl Stieler (1781–1858), Neue Pinakothek
- Bernhard Strigel (1460–1528), Alte Pinakothek
- George Stubbs (1724–1806), Neue Pinakothek
- Franz von Stuck (1863–1928), Neue Pinakothek
- Michiel Sweerts (1618–1664), Alte Pinakothek
- David Teniers the Younger (1610–1690), Alte Pinakothek
- Gerard ter Borch (1617–1681), Alte Pinakothek
- Berthel Thorvaldsen (1768/70-1844), Neue Pinakothek
- Giovanni Battista Tiepolo (1696–1770), Alte Pinakothek
- Domenico Tintoretto (1560–1635), Alte Pinakothek
- Tintoretto (1518–1594), Alte Pinakothek
- Titian (1485–1576), Alte Pinakothek
- Henri de Toulouse-Lautrec (1864–1901), Neue Pinakothek
- Maurice Quentin de La Tour (1704–1788), Alte Pinakothek
- J. M. W. Turner (1775–1851), Neue Pinakothek
- Fritz von Uhde (1848–1911), Neue Pinakothek
- Diego Velázquez (1599–1660), Alte Pinakothek
- Esaias van de Velde (1587–1630), Alte Pinakothek
- Henry van de Velde (1863–1957), Neue Pinakothek
- Willem van de Velde the Younger (1633–1707), Alte Pinakothek
- Carle Vernet (1758–1836), Neue Pinakothek
- Claude Joseph Vernet (1714–1789), Alte Pinakothek
- Ferdinand Georg Waldmüller (1793–1865), Neue Pinakothek
- Andy Warhol (1928–1987), Pinakothek der Moderne
- Joseph Wenglein (1845–1919), Neue Pinakothek
- Adriaen van der Werff (1659–1722), Alte Pinakothek
- Rogier van der Weyden (1400–1464), Alte Pinakothek
- David Wilkie (artist) (1785–1841), Neue Pinakothek
- Richard Wilson (painter) (1713/1714–1782), Neue Pinakothek
- Franz Xaver Winterhalter (1805–1873), Neue Pinakothek
- Francisco de Zurbarán (1598–1664), Alte Pinakothek
