= Rudolf Hirth du Frênes =

German painter

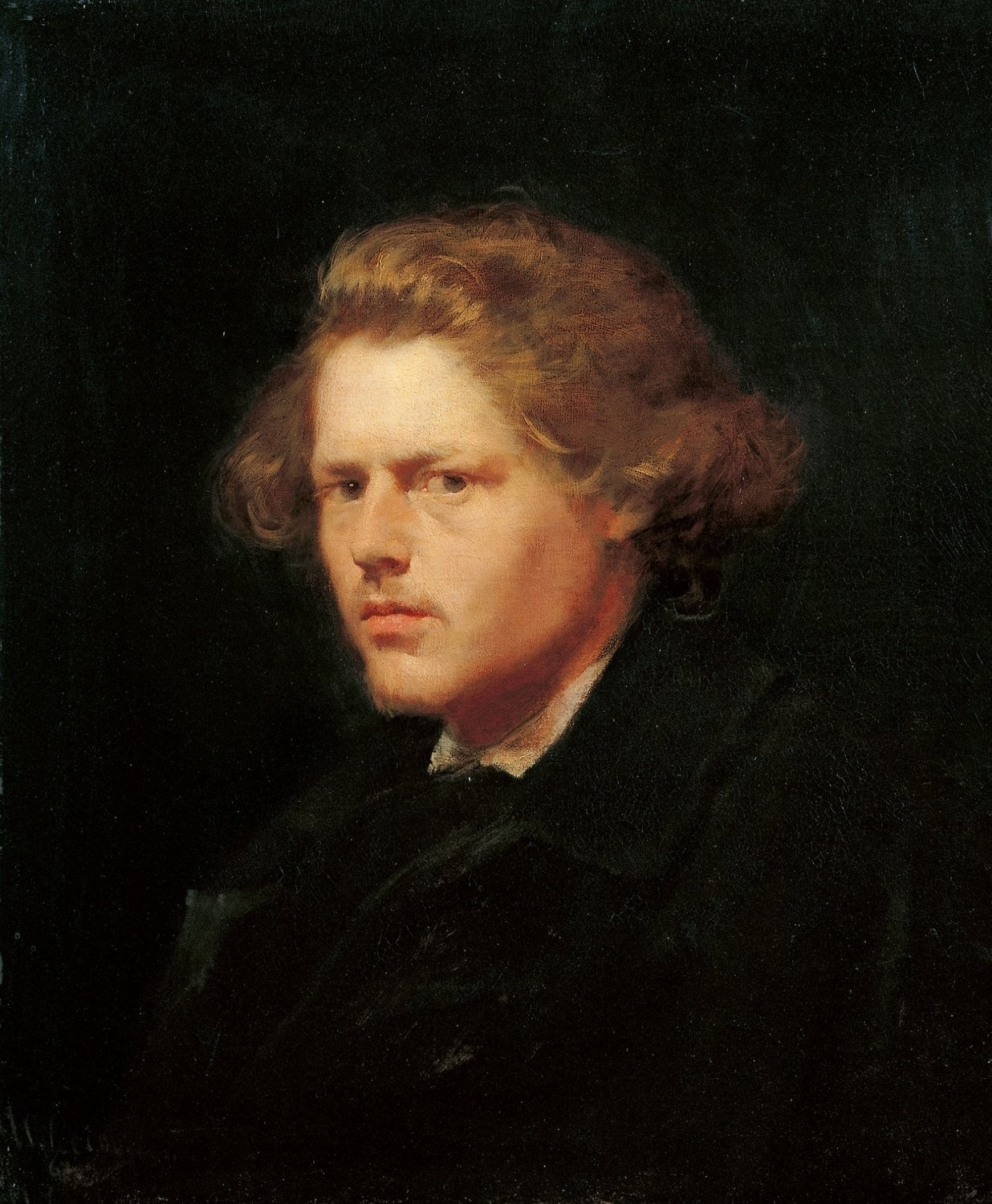
Rudolf Hirth du Frênes (1867). Portrait by Wilhelm Leibl

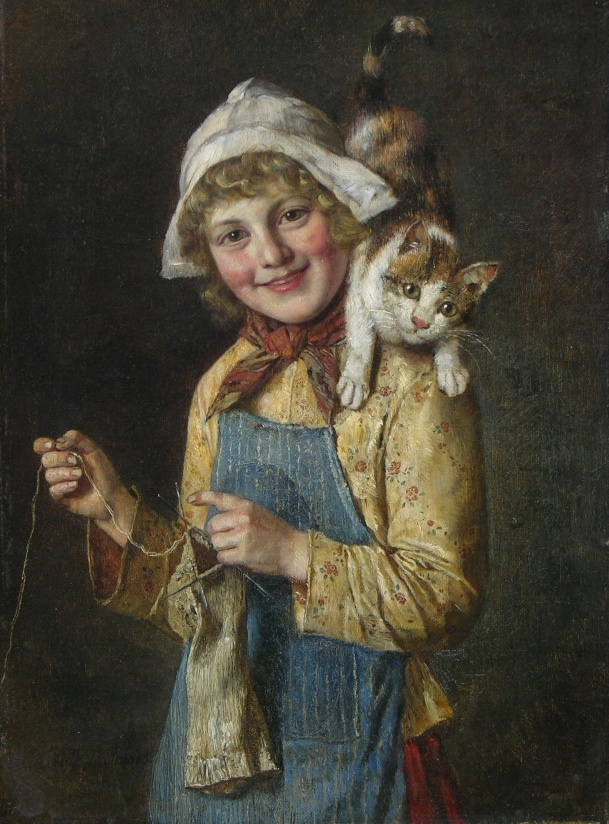
Young Friends

Rudolf Hirth du Frênes (24 July 1846 – 1 May 1916) was a German painter.

== Life ==
He was born in Gräfentonna, near Gotha. His father was a notary. Du Frênes was his mother's maiden name, which he adopted for professional use. At the age of fifteen, he enrolled at the Academy of Fine Arts, Nuremberg, where he studied with August von Kreling. Four years later, on the recommendation of his teachers, he transferred to the Academy of Fine Arts Munich and became a pupil of Hermann Anschütz. The following year, he joined a class at the studios of Arthur von Ramberg and worked there until the latter's death in 1875.

While in Ramberg's class, he met Theodor Alt, Johann Sperl and Wilhelm Leibl. In 1869, they came together to share a studio in Munich and formed the core of an artists' group that was later known as the "Leibl-Kreis" (Leibl Circle).

Around 1880, began a lengthy study trip which took him to Holland, Belgium and France where he visited all the major studios, galleries and museums. After five years, he returned to Germany, tied up his affairs in Munich and settled in Dießen am Ammersee.

The influence of Leibl on Hirth's work was substantial. Even when Leibl was influenced by Gustave Courbet that, in turn, influenced Hirth. And, despite Hirth's discovery of Frans Hals and the obvious influence on his work, his paintings after the dissolution of the Leibl-Kreis are generally considered to be less inspired than those done before. For most of his life, he supported himself by painting portraits, which occasionally rise to the quality of his early work. He later moved to Miltenberg, where he died, aged seventy. Many of his works can be seen in the Municipal Museum of Miltenberg.

Friedrich Hirth, the sinologist, and Georg Hirth, the journalist who created Jugend magazine, were his brothers.
