= Johann Sperl =

German painter (1840–1914)

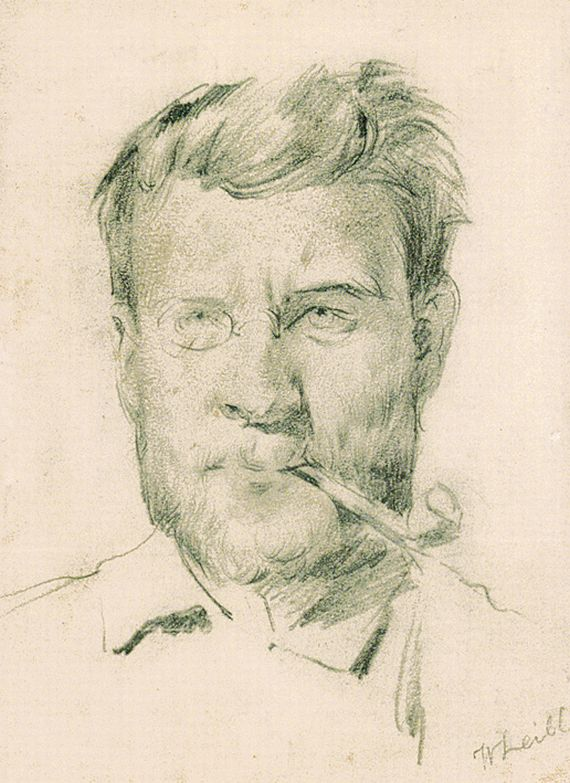
- Johann Sperl, drawn by Wilhelm Leibl
- Born: Johann Spörl; 3 November 1840; Buch, Kingdom of Bavaria
- Died: 29 July 1914 (aged 73); Bad Aibling, Kingdom of Bavaria, German Empire
- Education: Hermann Anschütz, Karl von Piloty, Arthur von Ramberg
- Known for: Painting

Johann Sperl (3 November 1840 – 29 July 1914) was a German painter.

== Life ==
Johann Sperl was born (as Johann Spörl) in Buch (now part of Nuremberg, Middle Franconia) in 1840 as an only child of Protestant parents. His father worked as an agricultural day laborer in the summer and as a wood worker in the winter. His mother worked as a housekeeper. The family lived in the next-door house of a homestead.

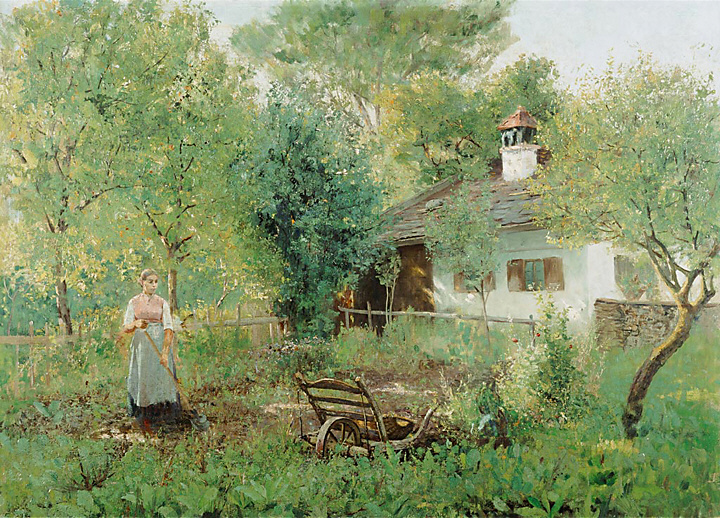
Johann Sperl: Mädchen im Bauerngarten, c. 1885

=== School years ===
In 1846 Sperl started attending school from which he graduated in 1854 as class winner. The local pastor assisted Sperl in securing an apprenticeship as a colorist. With the death of his father in 1856, Sperl became the sole provider of his sick mother and started an apprenticeship to become a lithographer.

In the winter of 1858–59 Sperl fulfilled his wish of attending drawing courses at Nürnberger Kunstgewerbeschule. At this time the Kunstgewerbeschule was led by August von Kreling, a versatile history painter and sculptor. Sperl met the painters Rudolf Hirth du Frênes and Theodor Alt there. In 1865 the three artists met again in Munich and subsequently became members of the Leibl-Circle. He became director of a lithographic institution in 1863.

=== Time at the academy in Munich ===
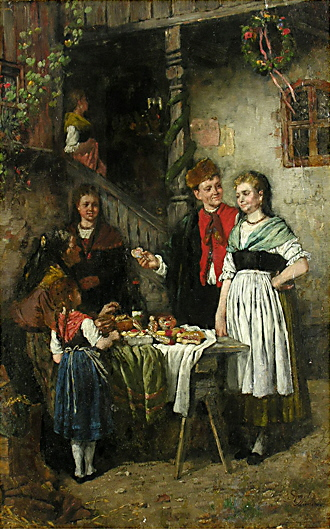
Johann Sperl: Das Fest vor dem Haus

Sperl gave up his position as a director in the spring of 1865 after he had earned enough money to attend the academy in Munich. He joined the painting class of history painter Hermann Anschütz. In 1865 he met Wilhelm Leibl, which led to a lifelong friendship between the two.

Sperl attended the master class of Karl von Piloty a history painter who was well known beyond Munich and whose pupils included Hans Makart, Franz von Lenbach, Eduard von Grützner, Franz Defregger and Gabriel von Max among others.

=== Study period with Ramberg ===
In the spring of 1866 Arthur von Ramberg was called from Vienna to Munich and took over the master class in Munich. Since Sperl had a genial relationship with Ramberg he continued to be his pupil and left the academy only after Ramberg's death in 1875.

Even though Sperl was a member of the Leibl-Circle his training under Ramberg was decisive in forming Sperl's style. In the early 1870s he demonstrated his mastery in several large compositions with many figures, but from 1875 onwards he painted smaller compositions.

In 1878 he and Leibl moved to Berbling. In December of that year Max Liebermann moved from Venice to Munich, and Sperl met him sometime in 1879, most likely through Leibl. In the early 1880s Sperl became more involved with painting landscapes.

=== Last years ===
In winter of 1882 Sperl moved to Kraiburg which was recommended to him by friends for its location. In 1883 he moved to Willhelm Leibl's new studio in Bad Aibling, Upper Bavaria. In May 1899 Sperl traveled to Italy, visiting Florence, Siena and Venice. On the hot spring day of 24 May 1910, Sperl collapsed while painting on a blooming meadow. He suffered a stroke which led to a partial paralysis of the right side of his body. On 23 July 1914, a few days before the outbreak of World War I, Sperl died in Bad Aibling. His last wish was to be buried next to his friend Wilhelm Leibl in the same graveyard in Würzburg.
