= Theodor Alt =

German painter (1846–1937)

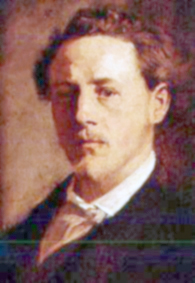
Self-portrait (c.1874)

Theodor Zacharias Friedrich Alt (23 January 1846 – 8 October 1937) was a German painter.

== Life ==
He was born in Döhlau. The son of Döhlau's pastor, Alt received his earliest education from his parents, and later attended the Old Latin School in Regensburg, where his father was head of the Protestant community from 1856 to 1870.

From 1861 to 1863, he studied at the Academy of Fine Arts, Nuremberg then, upon the recommendation of his teachers, moved to the Academy of Fine Arts Munich. He initially studied with Hermann Anschütz, followed by Arthur von Ramberg from 1866 to 1873. In 1869, he joined with former classmates Wilhelm Leibl, Rudolf Hirth du Frênes and Johann Sperl to share a studio. Together, they formed the core of an artists' group that would come to be known as the "Leibl-Kreis" (Leibl Circle).

As was true of everyone in the Circle, Alt was heavily influenced by Liebl and was never able to step entirely out of his shadow. In 1873, he moved to Petersaurach to set up an independent studio, but the onset of mental illness three years later forced him to temporarily stop painting.

Despite some brief improvement, he found it necessary to live in Adelshofen with his mother from 1878 to 1884. He produced very little work, however, as he was tormented by insomnia, hallucinations and violent impulses that led to several stays at the psychiatric hospital in Erlangen.

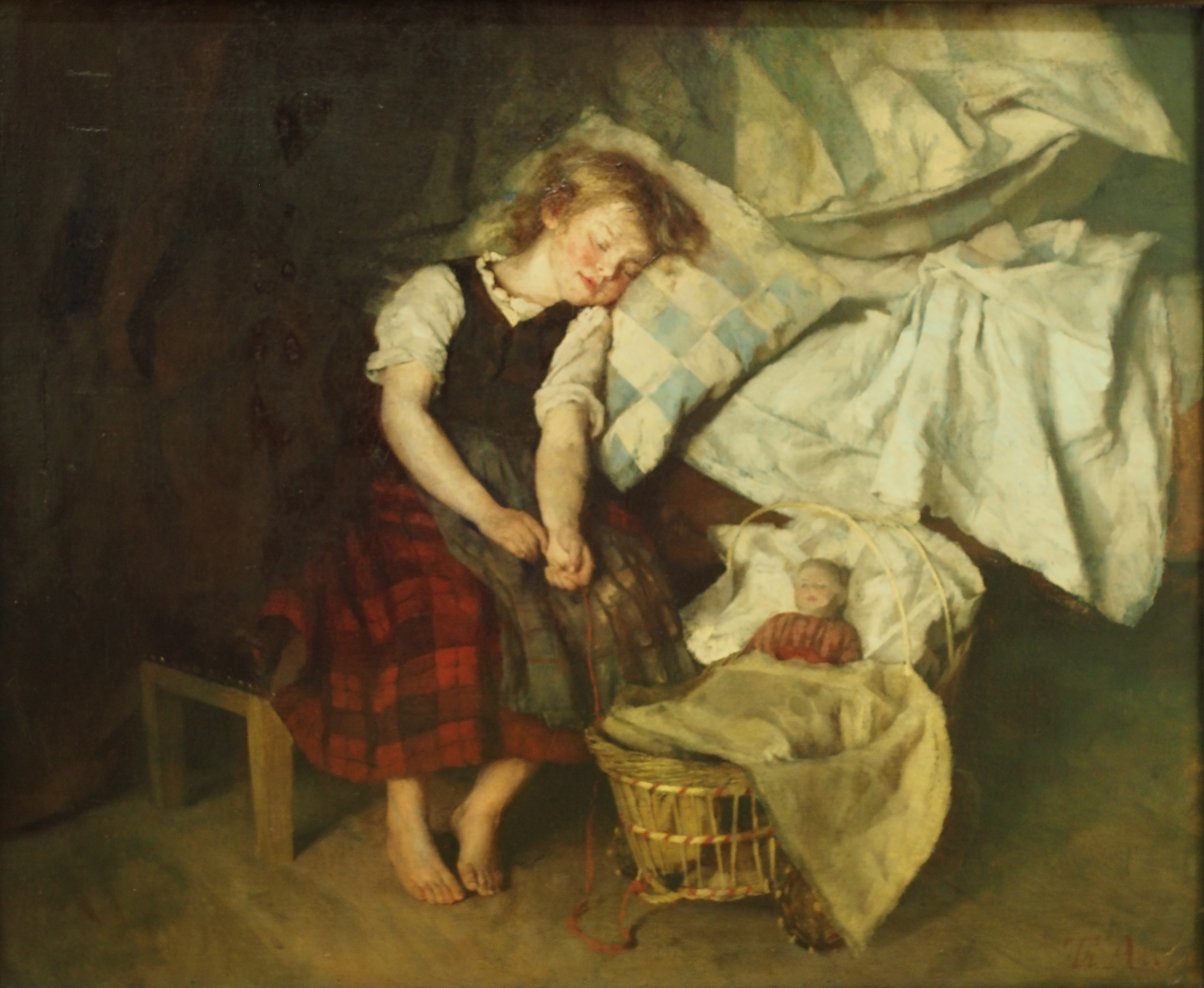
Late Riser (1871)

In 1884, he and his mother moved to Rothenburg, where better medical care was available. After his mother's death in 1901, he moved to Ansbach, living with a pastor's widow who served as his nurse. He remained there until his death at the age of 91, still producing the occasional watercolor of the local landscape.

Most of his estate is in the possession of the Reichsstadtmuseum Rothenburg.
