= Martin Eder =

German artist

Martin Eder (born 31 August 1968 in Augsburg) is a contemporary German painter. He lives and works in Berlin.

== Life and career ==
Martin Eder
- Born: 31 August 1968 (age 57); Augsburg, Germany
- Education: Augsburg University of Applied Sciences
- Website: This website may trigger epileptic seizures. Viewer discretion advised. martineder.com

Eder grew up in Batzenhofen. From 1986, he studied communication design at the Augsburg University of Applied Sciences, graduating in 1992. He then worked for a time in an advertising agency. From 1993 to 1995, he studied at the Academy of Fine Arts Nuremberg. From 1996 to 1999, he studied under Eberhard Bosslet at the Dresden Academy of Fine Arts and was Bosslet's master student from 1999 to 2001. Eder is represented internationally by the EIGEN + ART Gallery Berlin/Leipzig, Kunsthal Rotterdam, ARKEN Museum of Modern Art, Hirst's Newport Street Gallery, MUDAM Luxembourg, among others. He plays in his own experimental rock band under the name Richard Ruin et Les Demoniaques.

In spring 2017 in Berlin's Volksbühne theatre, Eder, as a trained hypnotist, put on a choreographed spiritual experience, inspiring later works such as that in the Psychic and Phantasma.

== Style ==
Martin Eder's style often involves depiction of young nude women and house pets, especially cats. Eder sees little difference in his inclusion of pets and humans as both are "mammals." His works are often erotic in nature and have elements of Surrealism. His works' often include kitsch imagery.

Eder attempts to not replicate the existence of life but the illusion of such. In response to why house pets are often his core subjects, his often response is a denial of the premise: "I only paint the ghosts of cats and birds." His works involve not just the illusion of imagery but its contextual meaning: his works deal with the symbolism and learned-imagery behind the icons he paints. He argues the potency of the painting derives from the imagery confronting the viewer with their perception and beliefs of realist representation in which the work takes on qualities irregular to the viewer's typical perception of the subject matter.

While the majority of his works are made with oil on canvas, Eder works in a variety of mediums including watercolors, film, and photography. Eder has a variety of sculptures; one series made of aluminium-plated polystyrol & resin depicts near-melted representations of faces, including My laughing sister you are dead and Invisible.

== Exhibitions ==
=== Psychic ===
Psychic is an audiovisual exhibit, containing paintings, watercolors, sculptures, and film thematically connected via exploring a sense of limbo. Many of the paintings follow dominantly-female protagonists often donning medieval armor and weaponry; the video starring two women. The works deal with the juxtaposition of the in-between state: fantastic worlds meet the mundane, beauty borders on kitsch. Similar to Phantasma, this exhibit was influenced by his studies on hypnosis and spiritism. Many of the works use Christian iconography, such as the serpent of the Garden of Eden.

This exhibit was showcased at the MUDAM in Luxembourg City from June 17th to September 3rd of 2017.

=== Martyrium ===
The name of the exhibit attempts to recall the depictions of nudity of young men or boys, specifically saints or martyrs, in Renaissance artworks, e.g. Jesus Christ or Saint Sebastian, and the "agonizing and tedious" effort of directing one's "heterosexual male gaze towards another man." The role-reversal of dominating the subject matter with male, not female nudes, is the main theme of the exhibition, providing social commentary on the male gaze and machismo.

This exhibit was showcased at the Galerie EIGEN + ART in Leipzig from November 18th to December 20th of 2017.

=== Phantasma ===
The name of the exhibition, "Phantasma," (derived from the Greek word for phantom) was chosen due to its juxtaposition as an supernatural, eerie creature (i.e. a ghost) or the product of ones mind (such as from a day dream) that evolves into a creative expression. The exhibit, inspired by his studies of hypnosis and Lacanian psychoanalysis, "challenges the relationship between our perceived reality and the artificiality of collective images and after-images in general;" the exhibit attempts to invoke the supernaturality and sensual senseless of everyday mythology and the sublime.

This exhibit was showcased at the Galerie EIGEN + ART in Leipzig from April 10th to May 29th of 2021.

=== MOLOCH ===
MOLOCH is a solo retrospective exhibition that contains over 50 artworks spanning across Martin Eder's career. Throughout his oil paintings, Eden explores motifs of transgression. The works allude to a (post-)pandemic world as well as encounters with the underworld, such as that of Dante's Inferno.

This exhibit was showcased at the Glaspalast Augsbur in Augsburg, Germany from April 2 to June 12 of 2022.

== Copyright law case ==
In 2018 Eder painted The Unknowable which was sold and ended up in the collection of British artist Damien Hirst. Soon after, another artist named Daniel Conway became aware of the painting after a visit to Hirst's Newport Street Gallery in London. Conway filed a lawsuit to the effect that Eder had willfully plagiarized a part of his painting Scorched Earth. The court case took three years to reach a verdict, until Germany's legal system decided that Eder's painting didn't infringe on the Conways copyright protections, legally declaring Eder's work a pastiche that lawfully samples from the original artwork.

The painting also contains elements from the work Monastery ruins in the snow (1819) by Caspar David Friedrich.

"I thought I had to fight this fight because it was about the freedom of art," Eder said. "If you steal something, that is completely different. But within a collage, it gains a different meaning." Conway has appealed the judgement.
