= Susanne Kühn =

German painter

Susanne Kühn (born 1969 in Leipzig, Germany) is a contemporary German painter.

Susanne Kühn studied painting and graphic art at the Hochschule für Grafik und Buchkunst Leipzig (HGB) in Germany (1990–1995). Between 1995 -1998 she lived and worked in New York and completed postgraduate studies at the School of Visual Arts and Hunter College (1995–1996). In 1998 she moved to Boston. In 2001-02 she was awarded a Radcliffe Fellowship from the Radcliffe Institute for Advanced Study, Harvard University. Since 2002, Susanne Kühn lives and works in Freiburg i. B. and Nürnberg, Germany.

Since 2015 she is a professor for painting at the Academy of Fine Arts, Nuremberg.

== Grants and Fellowships ==
- 2001–2002 Radcliffe Fellowship, Radcliffe Institute for Advanced Study, Harvard University
- 1995–1996 Postgraduate Grant, German Academic Exchange Service, School of Visual Arts and Hunter College, New York

== Exhibitions (selection) ==
- 2015 BANK, Galerie Matthias Kleindienst, Leipzig, Germany
- 2014 World of Wild Animals, Beck & Eggeling, Duesseldorf, Germany
- 2012 15 Disegni, Sala 1, Centro Internazionale d'Arte Contemporanea, Rom, Italy
- 2012 Besuch, Staedtische Galerie Offenburg, Germany
- 2011 Garden Eden, Haunch of Venison, London, GB
- 2008 Susanne Kühn, Museum of Contemporary Art Denver, USA
- 2008 Future Tense: Reshaping the Landscape, Neuberger Museum of Art Purchase, New York, USA (group-show)
- 2007 Susanne Kühn, Kunstverein Freiburg, Germany
- 2007 New Paintings, Goff+Rosenthal, New York, USA
- 2006 Dragon Veins, University of South Florida Contemporary Art Museum, Tampa, Fla., USA (group show)
- 2005 International Biennale of Contemporary Art, Prague, (group show)
- 2004 EAST International, Norwich Gallery, Norwich, GB, (group show)
- 2003 Works on Paper, Bill Maynes Gallery, New York, USA
- 2002 Journey, Radcliffe Institute, Harvard University, Cambridge, USA
- 2001 Recent Works, Bill Maynes Gallery, New York, USA
- 2000 Recent Paintings, Samek Art Gallery, Bucknell University, Lewisburg, USA

== Reviews ==
- Philip Auslander: Susanne Kühn – Museum of Contemporary Art Denver. In: ArtForum. 12/2008.
- Melissa Kuntz: Susanne Kühn at Goff+Rosenthal. In: Art in America, 2/2006, Vol. 94 edition 2, S. 129.
- Lovelace, Carey. Susanne Kühn at Bill Maynes, Art in America. 11/2002, Vol. 90 edition 11, S. 160.
- Ken Johnson: ART IN REVIEW; Susanne Kuhn. In: The New York Times. 8 December 2000.
- Thad Ziolkowski: Susanne Kühn – Bill Maynes Gallery. In: ArtForum. 12/1999.
- Roberta Smith: ART IN REVIEW; Suzanne Kuhn. In: The New York Times. 1 October 1999.
- David Ebony: David Ebony's Top Ten. In: Artnet.com. 10/1999.

== Monographs ==
- Ute Eggeling, Michael Beck (Hrsg.): Susanne Kühn. World of Wild Animals. Beck & Eggeling Kunstverlag, 2014, ISBN 978-3-930919-87-1.
- Staedtische Galerie Offenburg (Hrsg.): Susanne Kühn. Werke – Works 2006–2012. 2012, ISBN 978-3-00-039530-7.
- Forum Kunst Rottweil (Hrsg.): Susanne Kühn – Malerei, Zeichnung 2007–2009. Modo Verlag, 2009, ISBN 978-3-86833-018-2.
- Detlef Bluemler, Lothar Romain (Hrsg.): Künstler – Kritisches Lexikon der Gegenwartskunst. Ausgabe 81, Zeitverlag, 2008, ISSN 0934-1730.
- Kunstverein Freiburg and Museum of Contemporary Art, Denver (Hrsg.): Susanne Kühn. Hatje Cantz, 2007, ISBN 978-3-7757-2018-2.
