= Georg Goldberg =

German copper and steel engraver of Jewish descent (1830–1894)

Georg Goldberg (12 May 1830, Nuremberg – 25 July 1894, Munich) was a German copper and steel engraver of Jewish descent.

== Biography ==
Georg Goldberg studied in Nuremberg with Johann Leonhard Raab and at the Academy of Fine Arts, Nuremberg. He left for Munich in 1856, where he created most of his works. By 1890 he was a member of the Allgemeine Deutsche Kunstgenossenschaft.

== Works ==
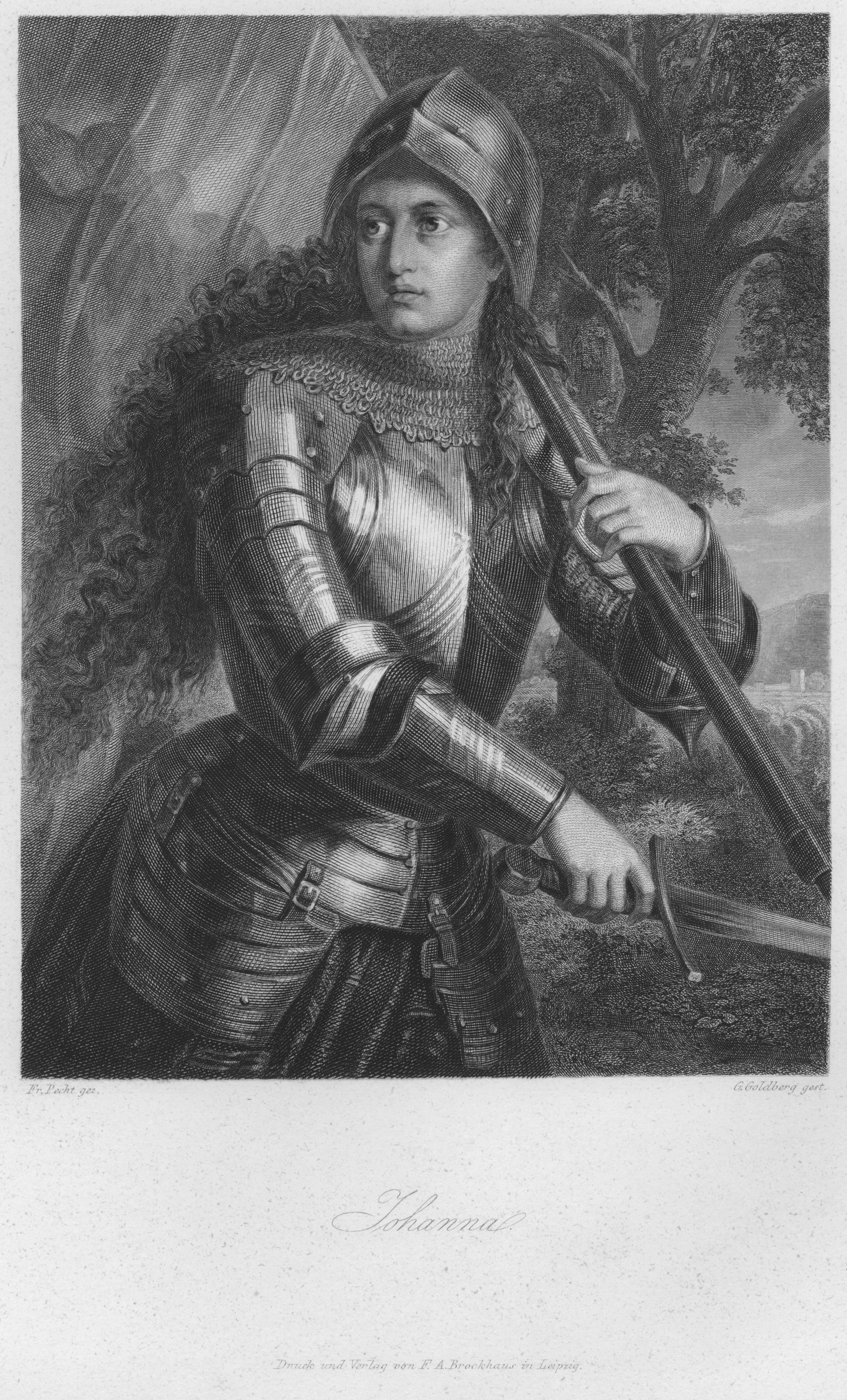
Joan of Arc, ca. 1859

- Bacchus und Ariadne, after Jacopo Tintoretto;
- Die Grablegung, after Giorgione;
- Illustrations for Alexander von Liezen-Mayer's scenes of Goethe's Faust;
- Das Erwachen des Frühlings, after Ernst Kaiser;
- Portrait of Oscar II of Sweden
- Joan of Arc (from Friedrich Schiller's The Maid of Orleans, for the 1859 publication Schiller-Galerie.
- Scenes for Friedrich Pecht's 1876 publication Shakespeare-Galerie
