= Diego Bianconi =

Swiss painter

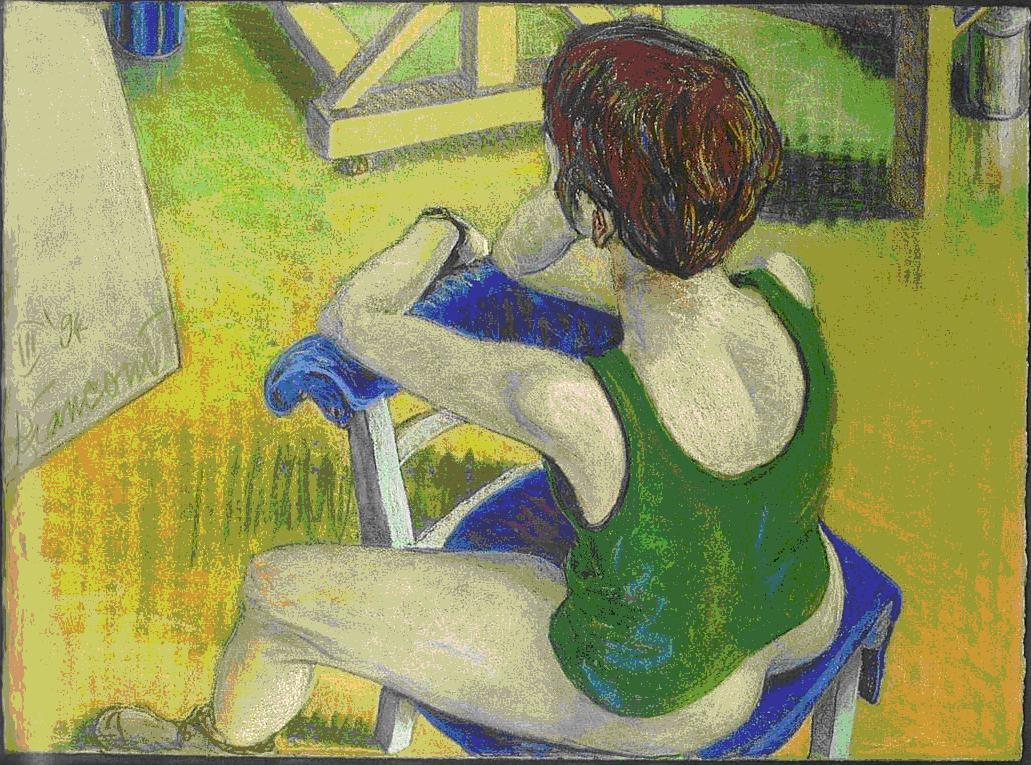
Modellpause, 1994, pastel, 108×79 cm

Diego Bianconi (born 1957 in Muralto, Locarno, Canton Ticino, Switzerland) is a Swiss painter.

From 1972 to 1973 Bianconi attended the C.S.I.A. Art School in Lugano. He received private instruction in painting and design with Leo Maillet, a master pupil of Max Beckmann, in 1982, and studied at the Academy of Fine Arts Nuremberg from 1988 to 1995. From 1995 to 1999 he taught life drawing at AdBK Nuremberg. In 2001 he created the Chalkografi Research Lab.

Bianconi is a member of the Schwabach Artists' Federation.

== Prizes and awards ==
- 1989–1991 Scholarship holder of the Dipartimento Istruzione e Cultura, Canton Tessin, Switzerland
- 1991 Danner-Stiftung Group prize
- 1998 Hollfeld painting prize
