= Franz Defregger =

Austrian painter (1835–1921)

Franz von Defregger
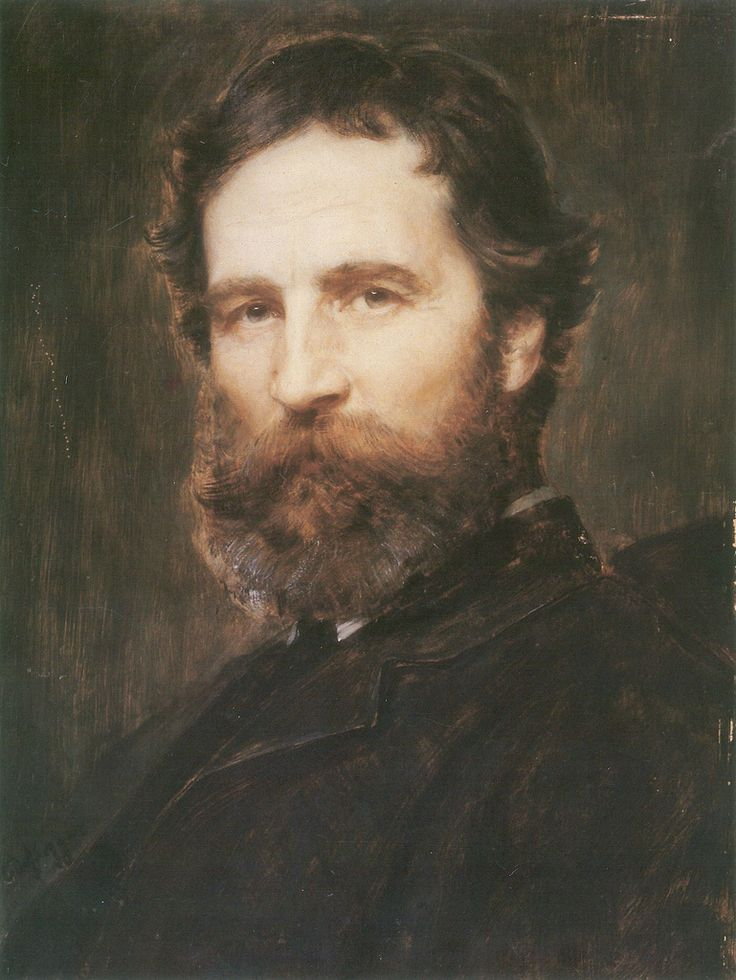
- Self Portrait, 1880
- Born: 30 April 1835; Stronach, Tyrol, Austrian Empire
- Died: 2 January 1921 (aged 85); Munich, Germany
- Resting place: Nordfriedhof, Munich
- Education: Academy of Fine Arts, Munich
- Known for: Painting, drawing
- Style: Genre art, history paintings
- Movement: Munich School
- Spouse: Anna Müller

Franz Defregger (after 1883 Franz von Defregger) (30 April 1835 – 2 January 1921) was an Austrian artist known for producing genre art and history paintings set in his native county of Tyrol.

== Biography ==
Franz Defregger was born on 30 April 1835 at the Ederhof in Stronach, Tyrol in the Austrian Empire. He was the second son of Maria (née Fercher) and Michael Defregger, a farmer, who also had five daughters. His mother and two of his sisters died in 1841 during a typhoid epidemic. Franz himself nearly died from the fever. During his early years, Franz developed a strong love of music, and learned to play the flugelhorn. He soon became a member of a local band in Dölsach, playing at weddings, assemblies, and balls. Franz also displayed an early talent for drawing and woodcarving, which he developed autodidactically while working on his father's farm.

After his father died in 1858, Franz took over the farm at the age of twenty-three. Within two years, however, he sold the farm and shared the money with his sisters who wanted to emigrate to America. Defregger moved to Innsbruck and studied woodcarving with the sculptor Michael Stolz, a professor at the Innsbrucker Trade School. Stoltz soon recognized Defregger's greater talent as a painter, and in the autumn of 1860, he arranged a meeting with Karl von Piloty at the Academy of Fine Arts in Munich. At Piloty's suggestion, Defregger attended a preparatory class at the Academy with Hermann Dyck. On 19 July 1861, Defregger passed the entrance examination and was accepted into the Academy. In the autumn of that year, he enrolled in a painting class given by Hermann Anschutz.

In the summer of 1863, with the encouragement of architect Dominik Stadler, Defregger travelled to Paris to enhance his studies at the academy. He enrolled at the École des beaux-arts on the recommendation of Alexander Laemlein. In 1864, he took part in the Salon des Refusés; the Salon catalog from 1864 listed him as "élève de l'École des Beaux-Arts". During his time in Paris, Defregger's work was influenced by his experiences in the city and through autodidactic study at museums, art collections, and studios. After spending two years in Paris, Defregger returned to Munich in July 1865 and began studying under Piloty at the academy.

During the next few years, Defregger also spent time in East Tyrol, painting portraits of his relatives and friends. Between 1867 and 1870, he worked with Hans Makart and Gabriel of Max in the studio of the Munich history painter Piloty. His paintings were popular, and he soon became successful as an artist. He was professor of history painting from 1878 to 1910 at the Munich Art Academy. He preferred portraits, rustic motifs from the everyday life, and dramatic scenes from the Tyrolean national uprising of 1809.

In 1883, Defregger was given the Order of Merit of the Bavarian crown, and was made a Knight of the collected personal nobility. He received numerous prizes and awards, including the Prussian Order of Merit for Science and the Arts. In 1906, his work was displayed at the Century of German Art exhibition in Berlin. His students included the Gröden artists Josef Moroder Lusenberg and Hans Perathoner, Lovis Corinth, Robert Koehler, Walter Thor, Hugo Engl, Emma von Müller and many others. Defregger also worked alongside other artists in the studio, especially Rudolf Epp, developing a style consistent with the Munich school.

Franz Defregger died in Munich in 1921 at the age of 85. He was buried at Nordfriedhof in Munich.

== Legacy ==
Defregger's private home in Munich, called the Defregger House, was built by architect Georg von Hauberrisser. Defregger's residence in Bolzano, the Villa Defregger, was built in 1879 according to the plans of the Bolzano city architect Sebastian Altmann. In 1922 in Vienna, a street was named "Defreggerstraße" to honor the artist. Similar street dedications occurred in Bolzano and Gries am Brenner—both have since been renamed. Built in 1887, the Defreggerhaus refuge at the foot of the Großvenediger mountain was also named in his honor.

== Gallery ==
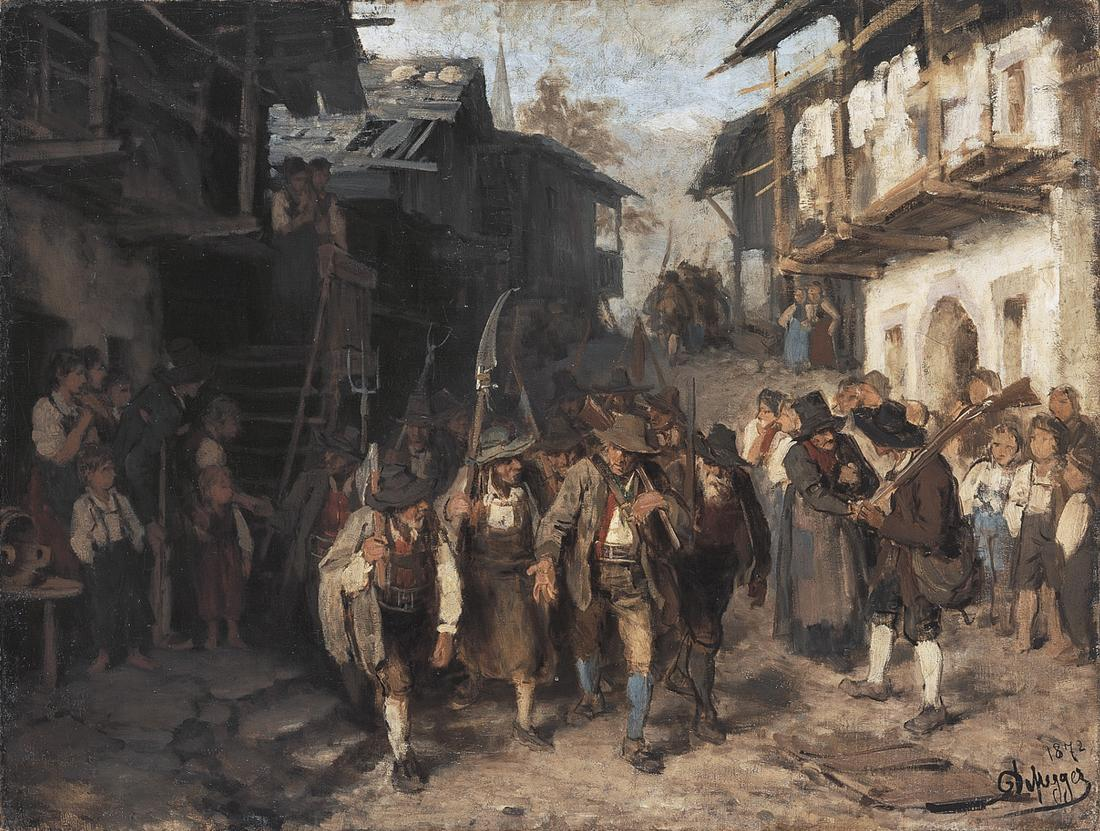
Das letzte Aufgebot, 1872

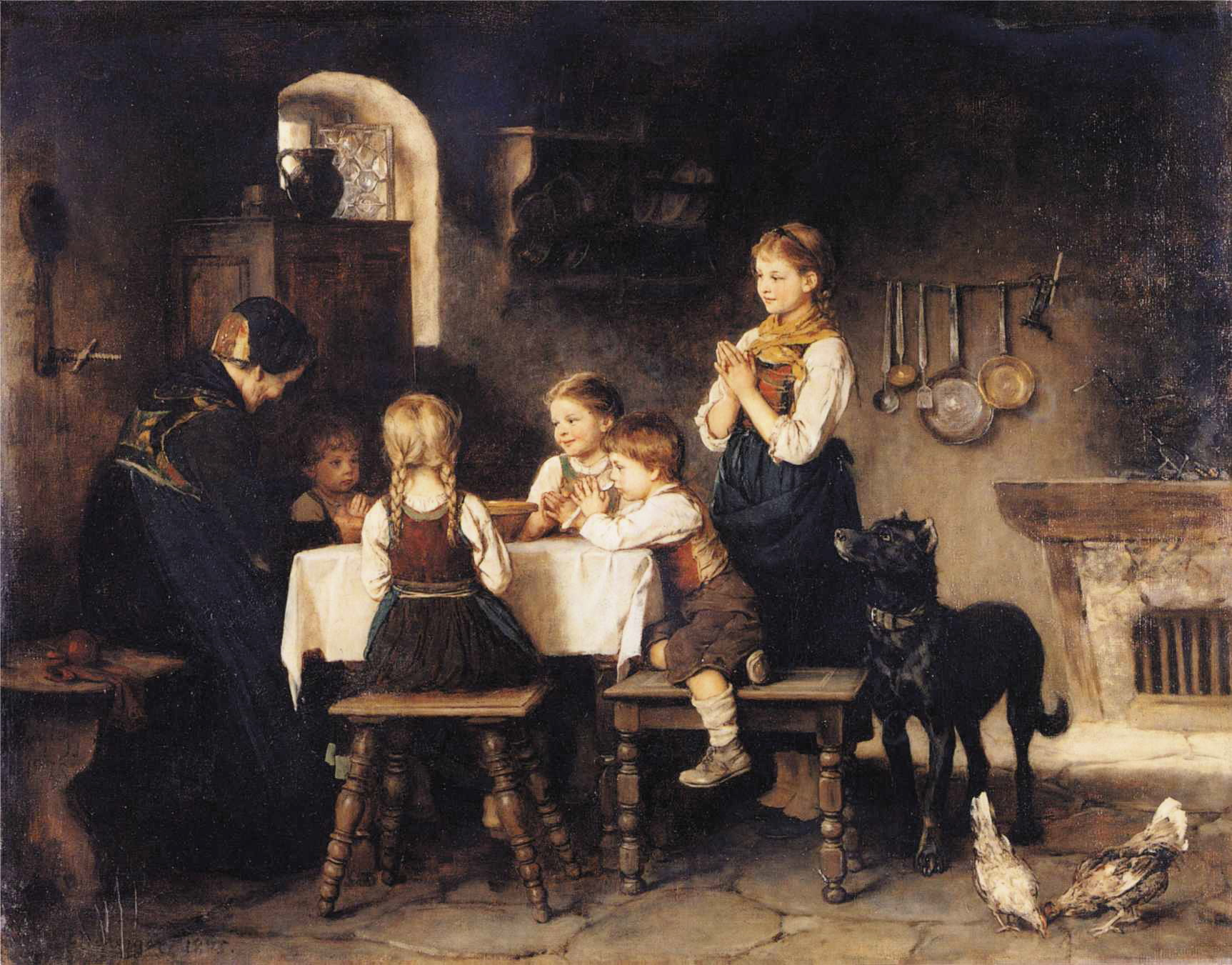
Grace Before Meal, 1875

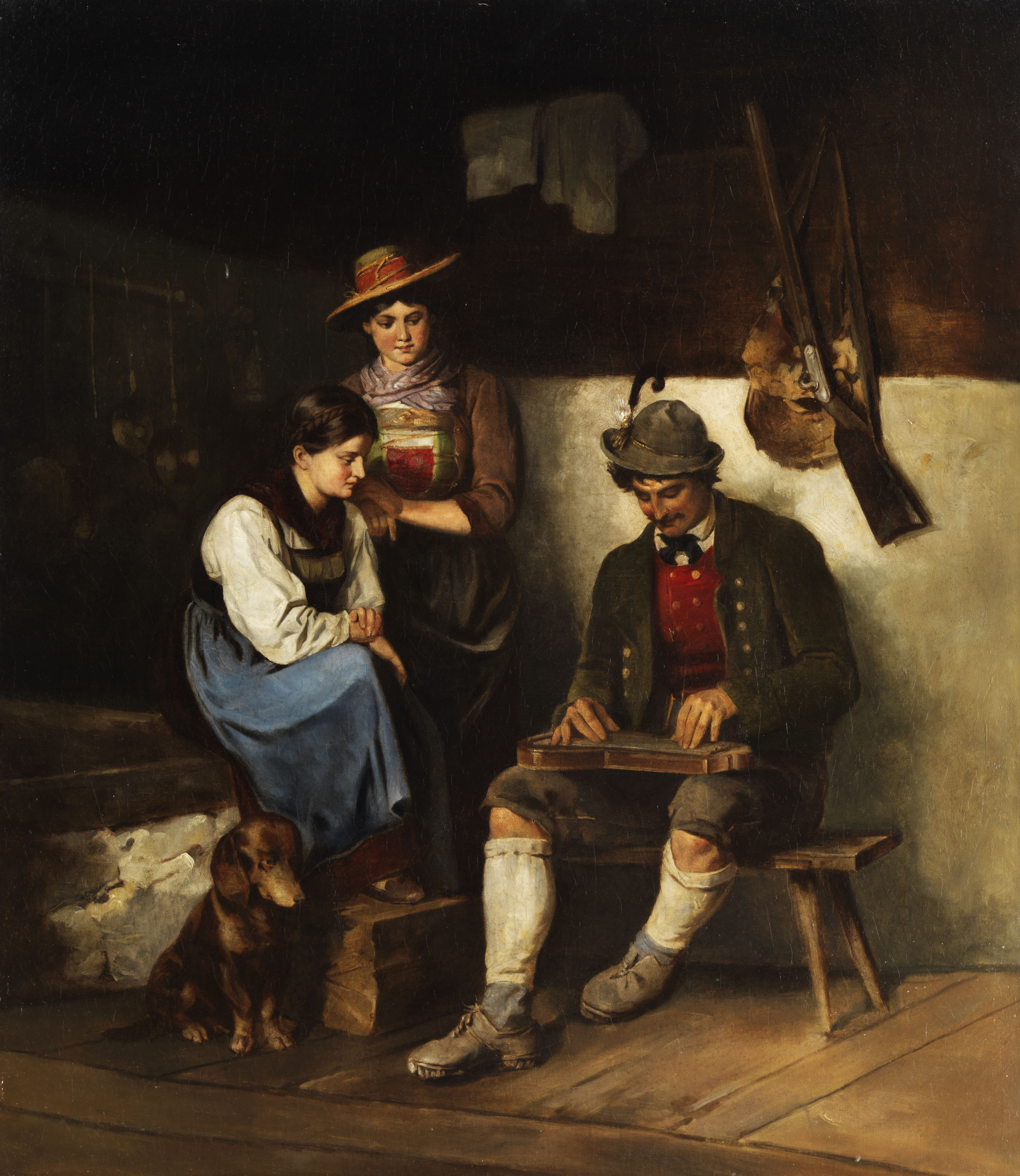
Der Zitherspieler, 1876

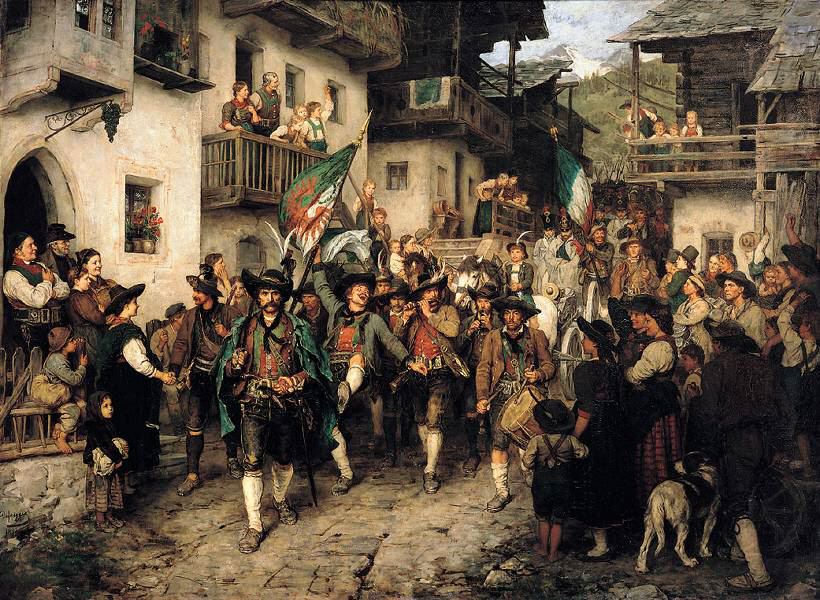
Heimkehrender Tiroler Landsturm im Krieg von 1809, 1876

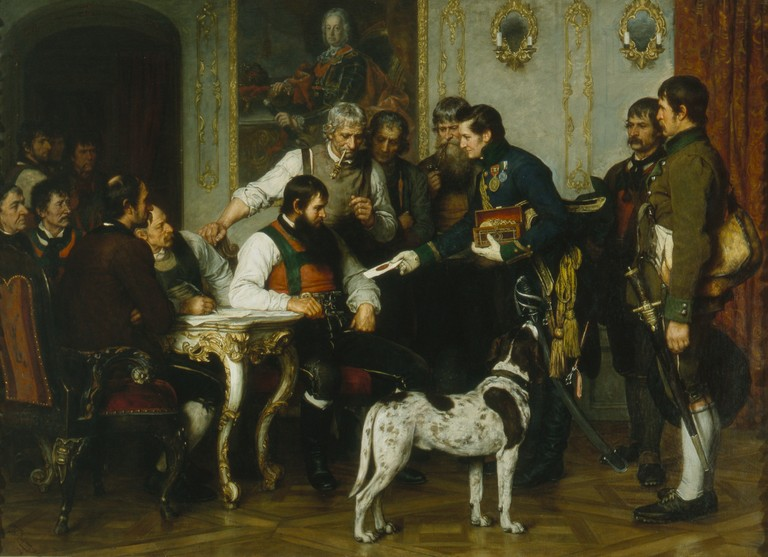
Andreas Hofer mit seinen Beratern in der Hofburg in Innsbruck, 1879

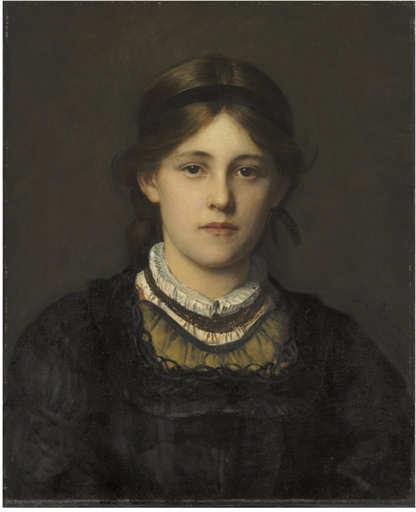
Beauty of the Tyrol, 1880

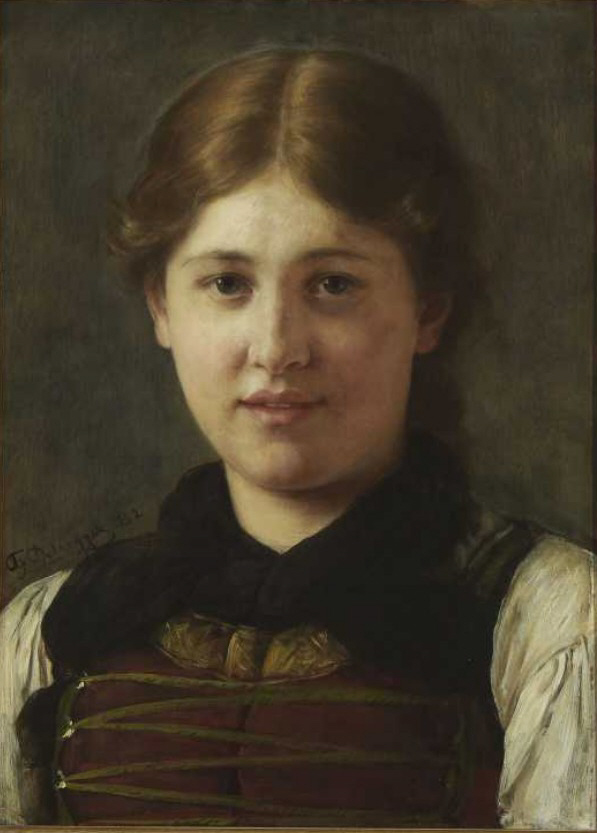
D'Zilli, 1882

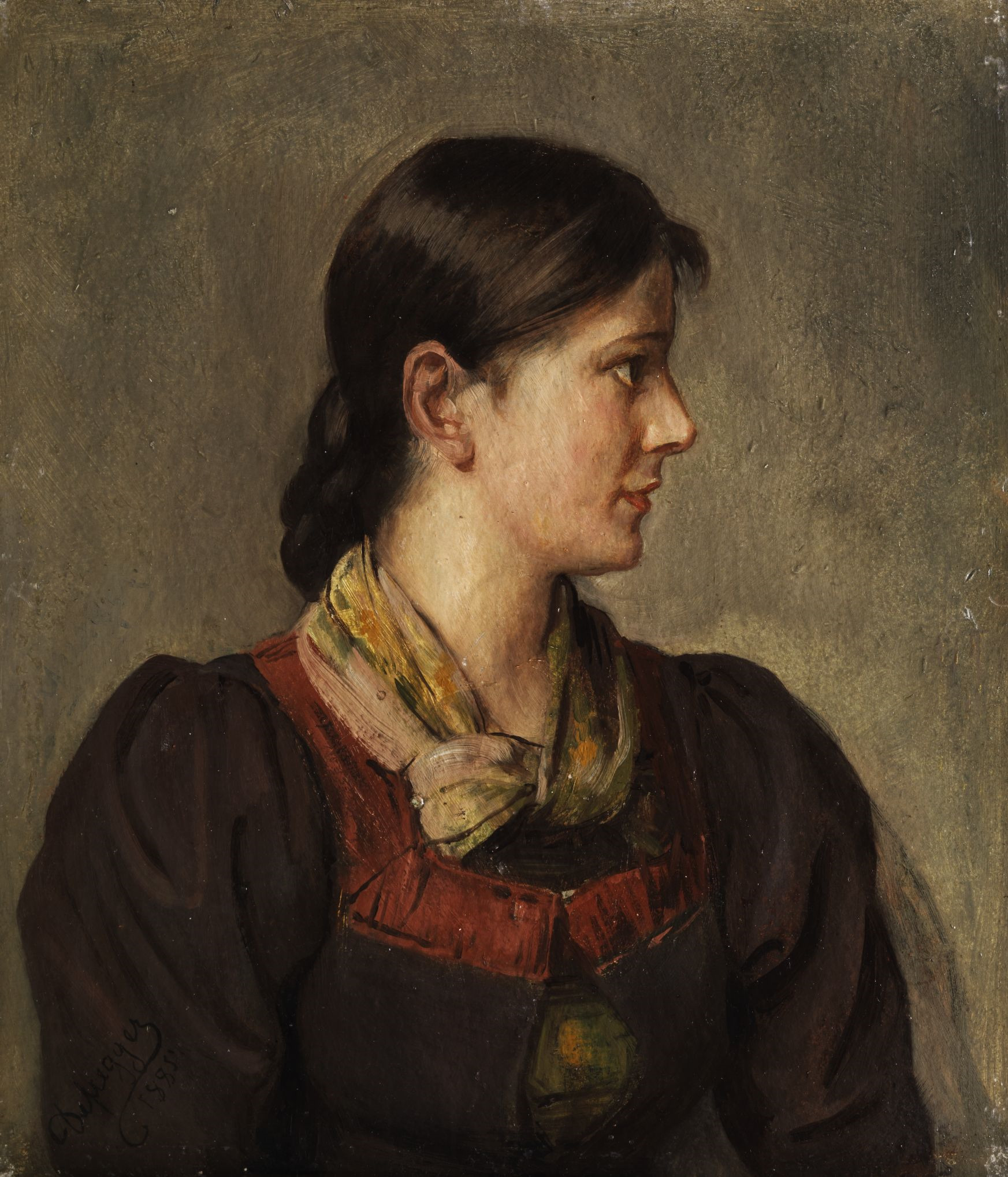
Bildnis eines jungen Bauernmädchens, 1885

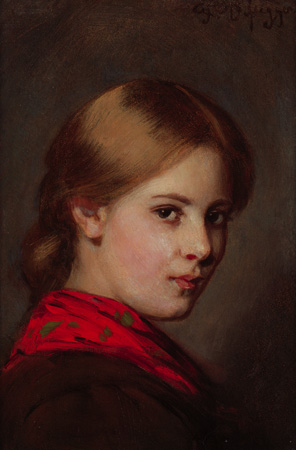
Bauerndirndl, 1890

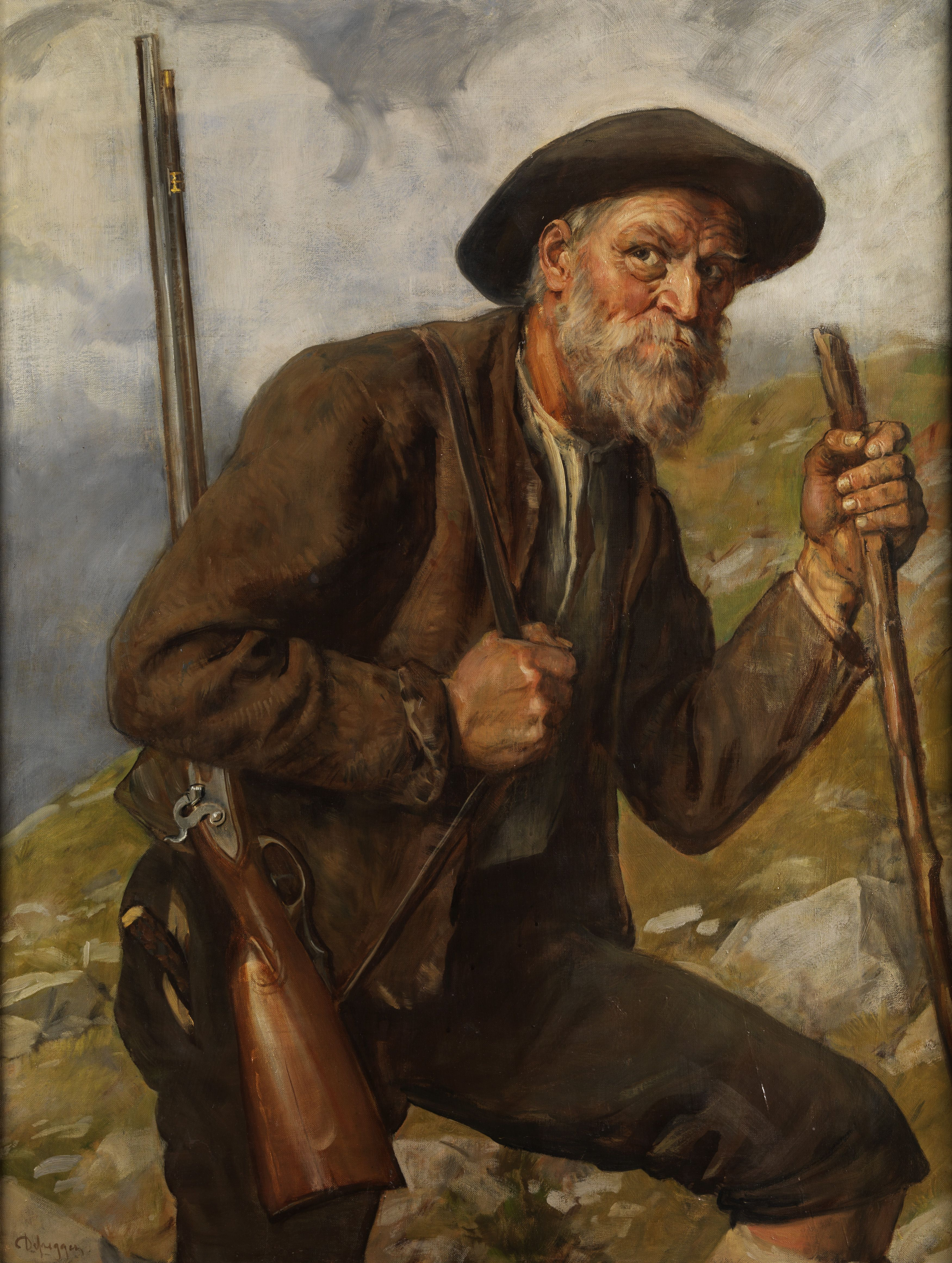
Alter Jäger mit Flinte im Hochgebirge, 1892

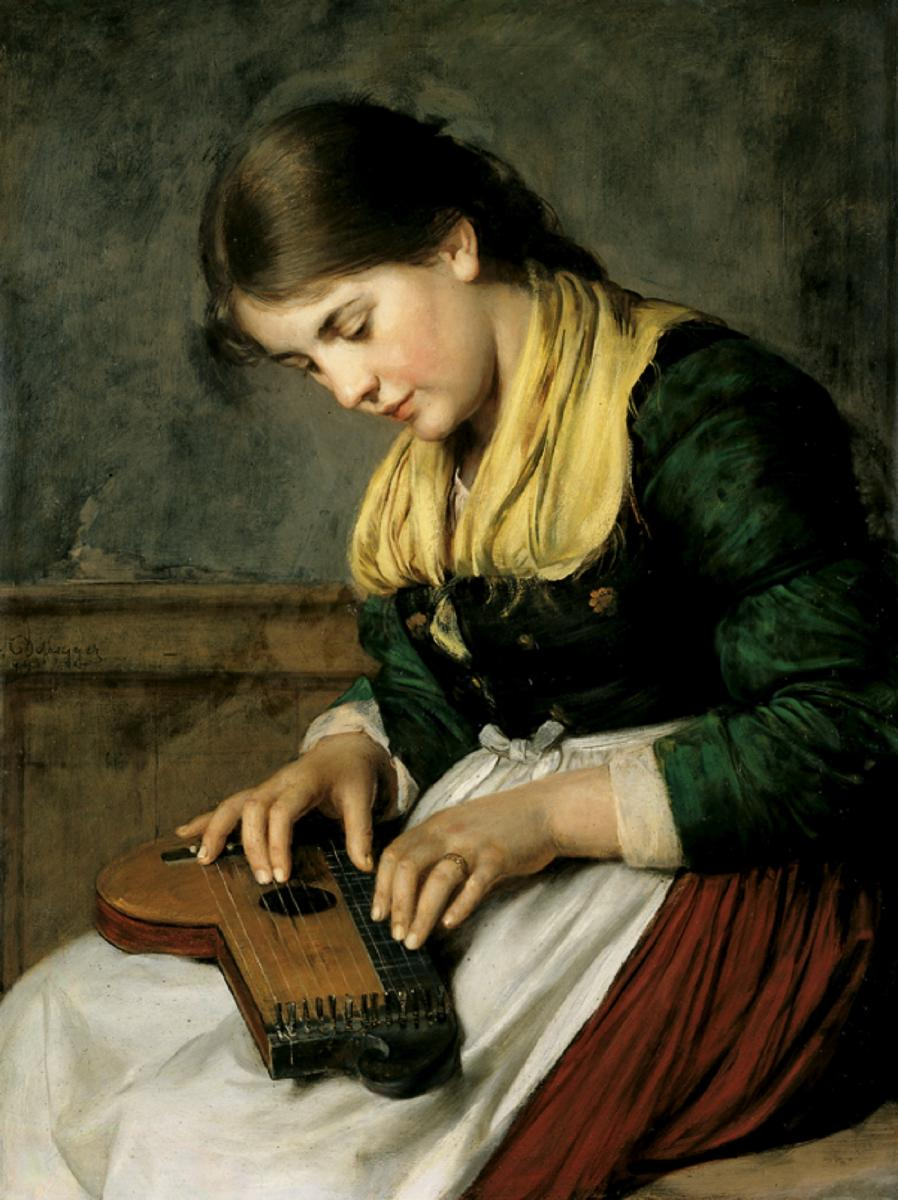
Zitherspielendes Mädchen, 1894

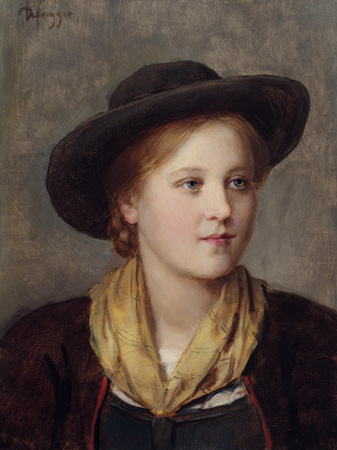
Tiroler Dirndl, c. 1895

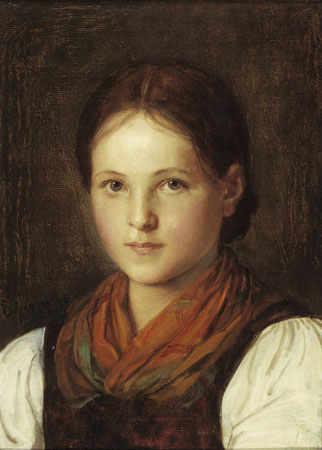
Bauerndirndl, 1896

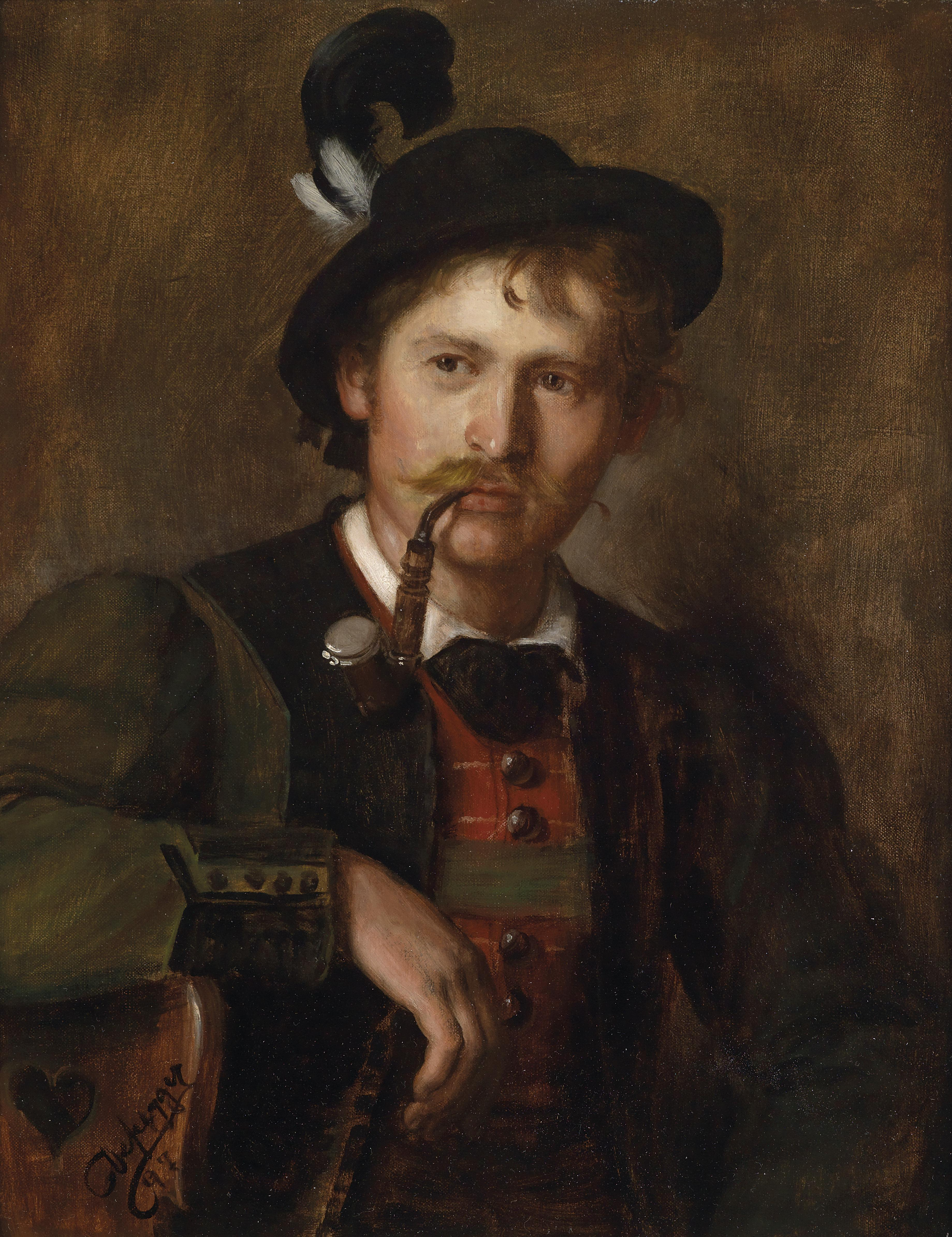
Portrait eines jungen Tirolers, 1897

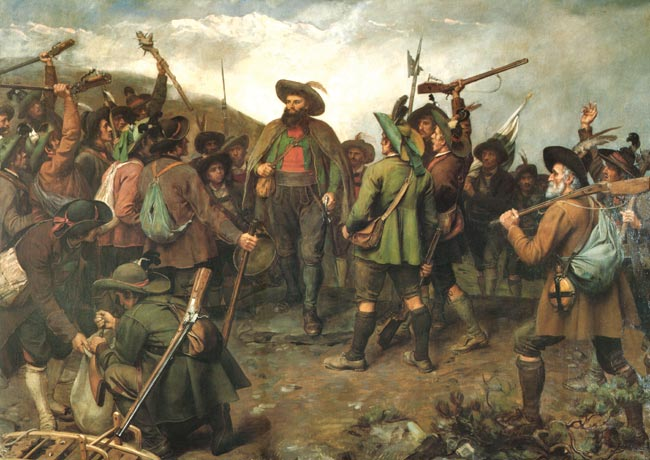
Victory of Andreas Hofer at Bergisel, 1809, 1900

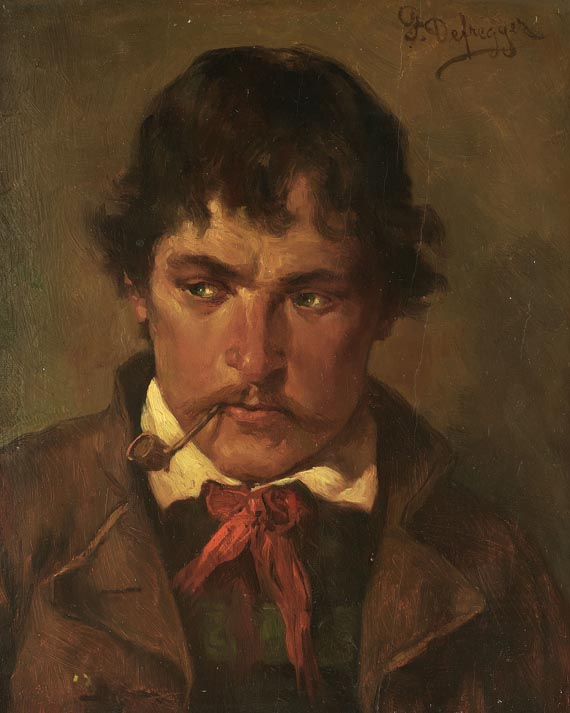
Bauernporträt, 1900

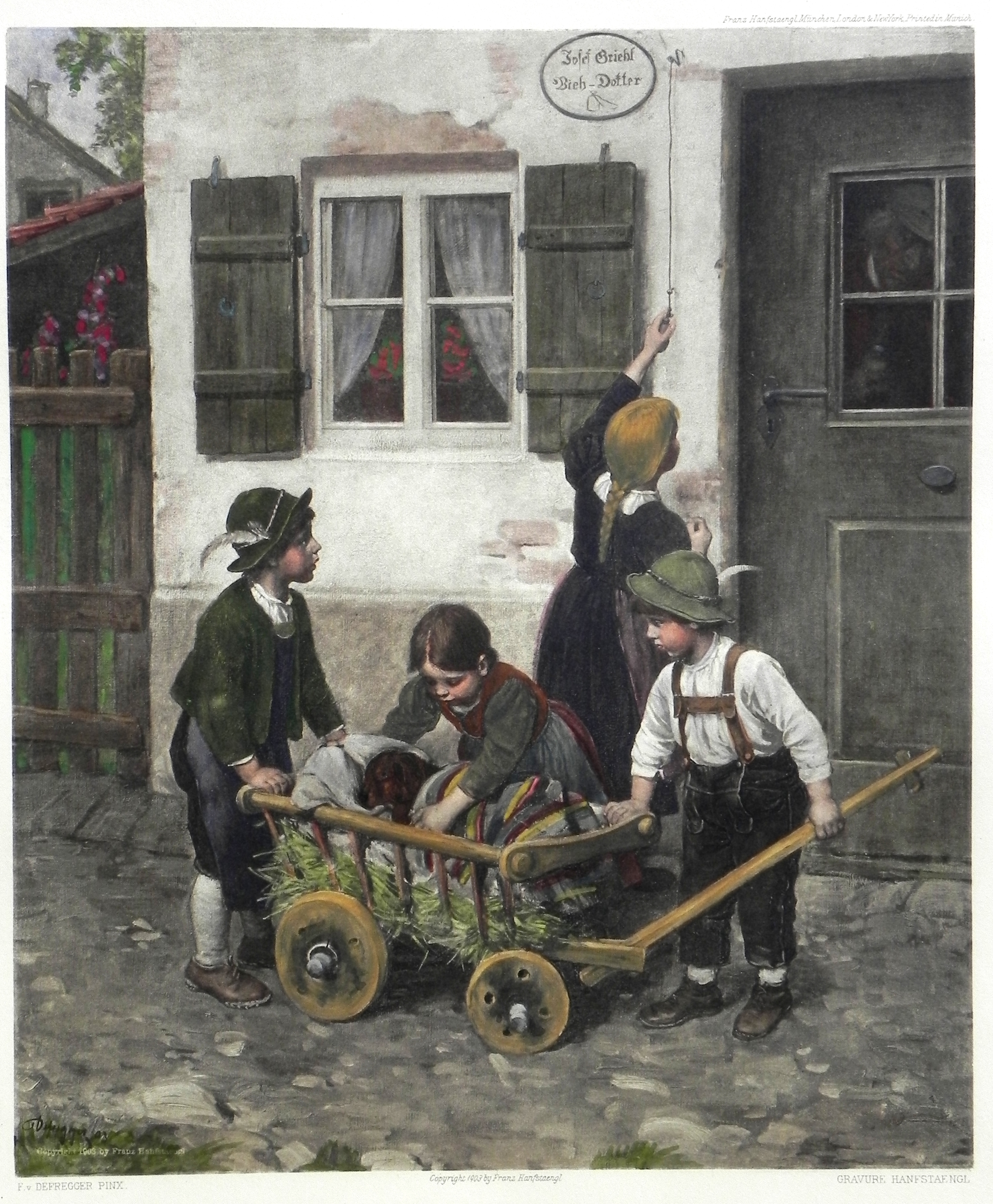
Der kranke Dackel, 1903

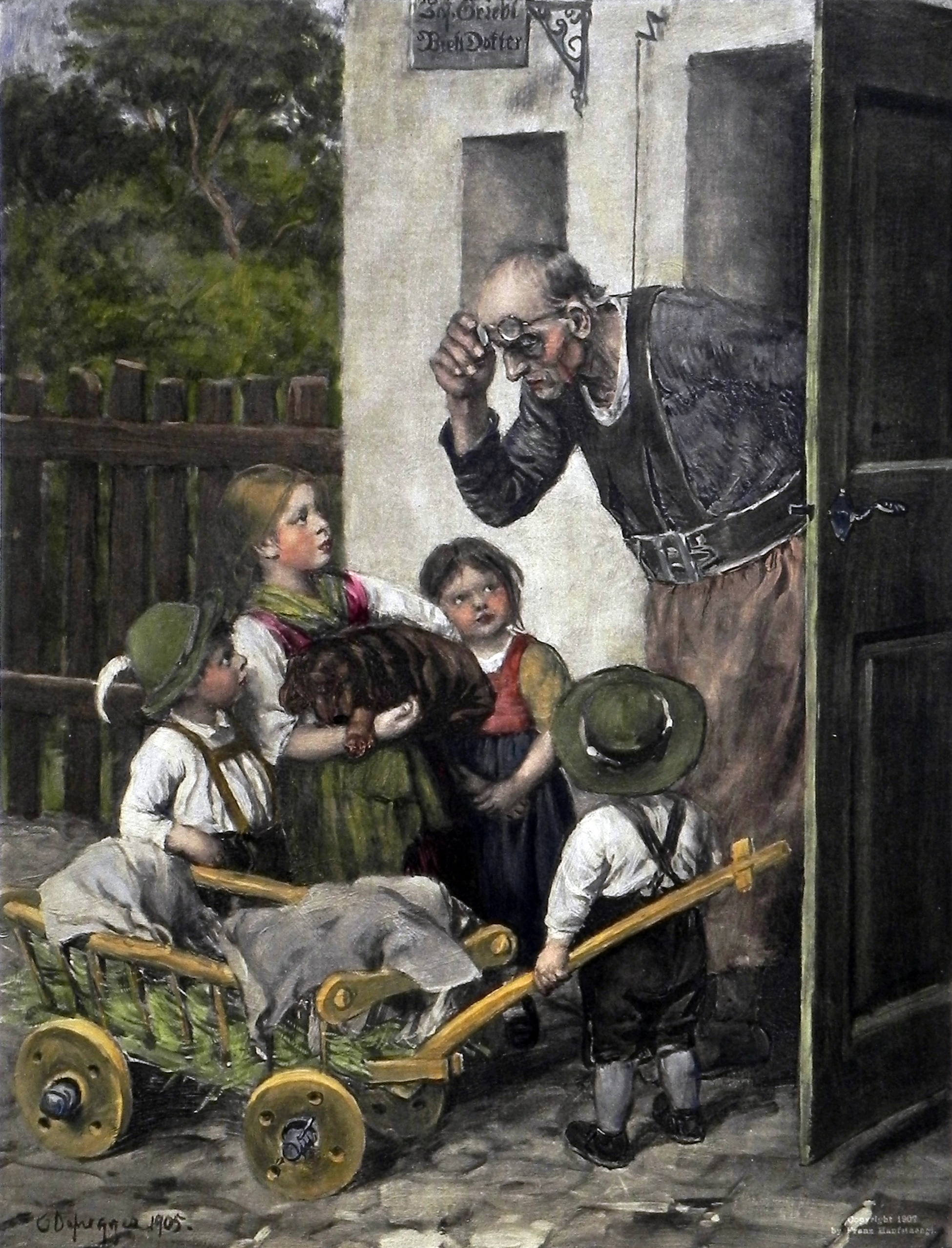
Schwer erkrankt, 1905

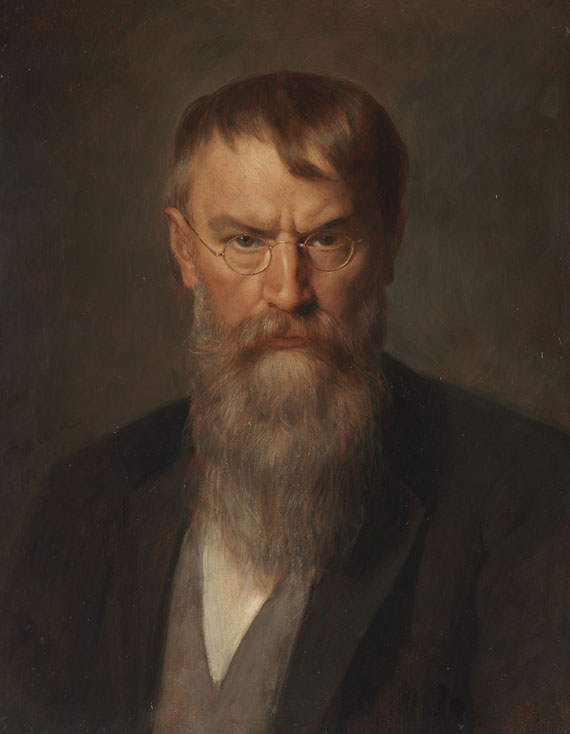
Portrait of Franz von Lenbach, 1907

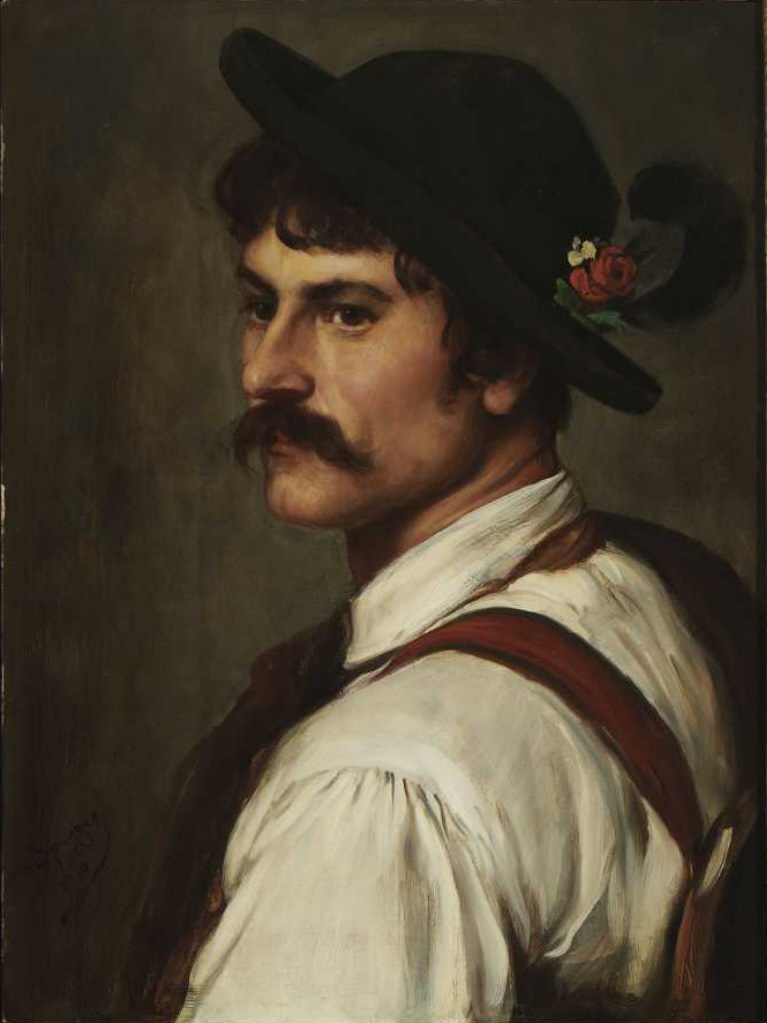
Junger Bauer, 1910

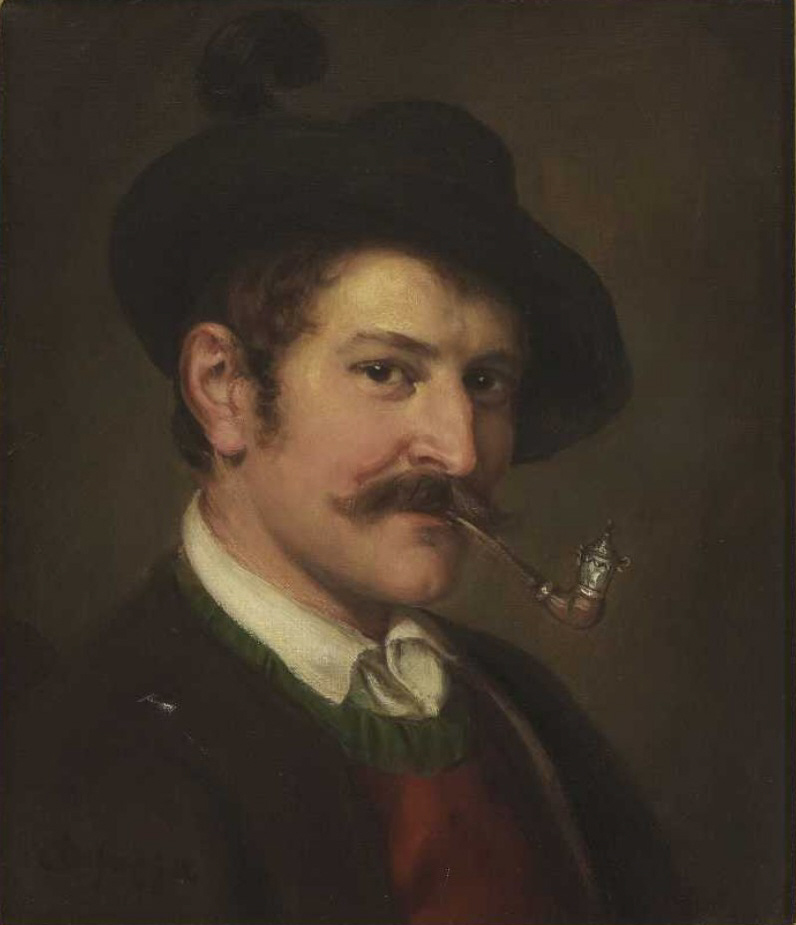
Tiroler Bauer mit Pfeife

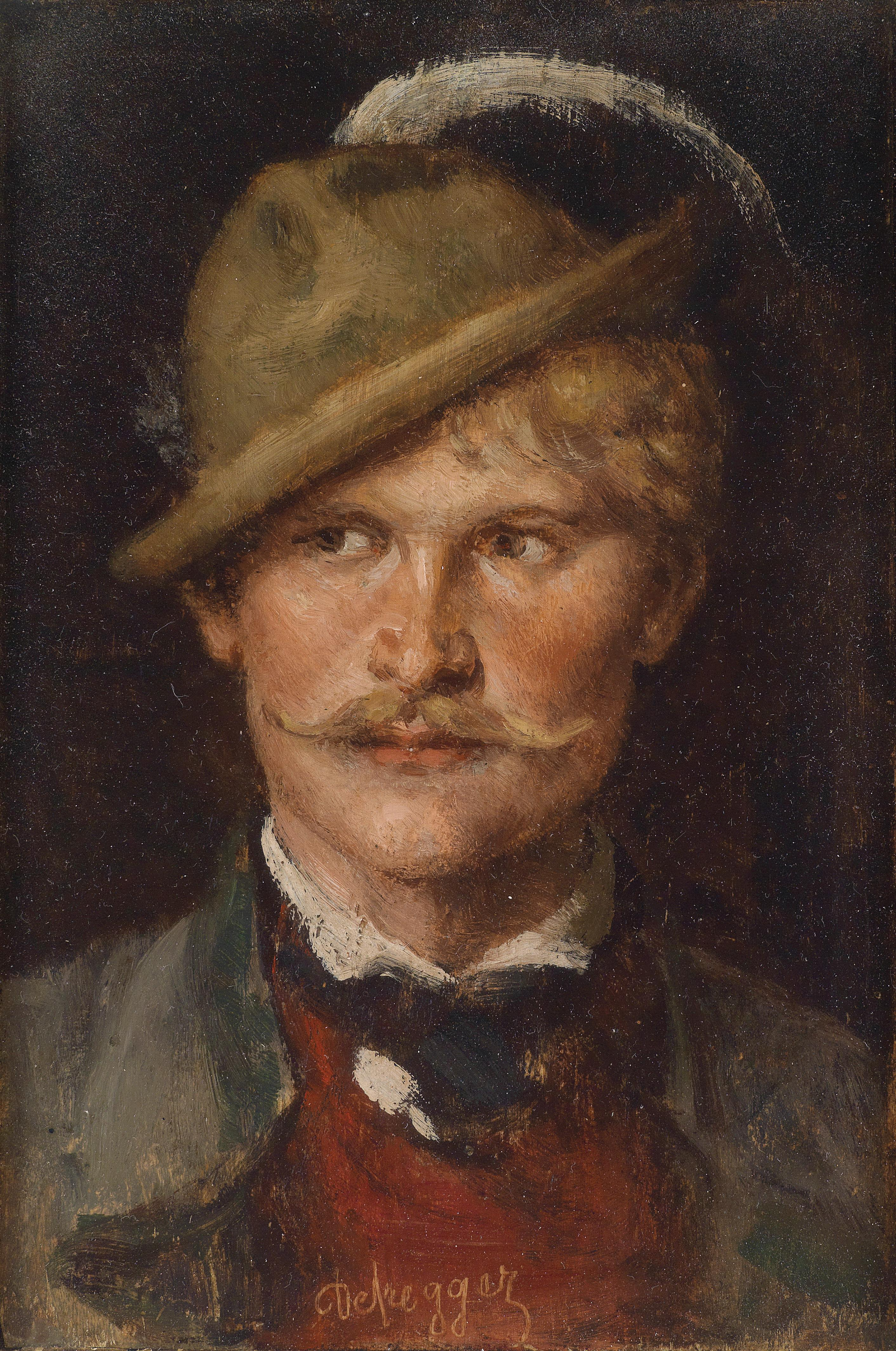
Bauernbursch mit Hut

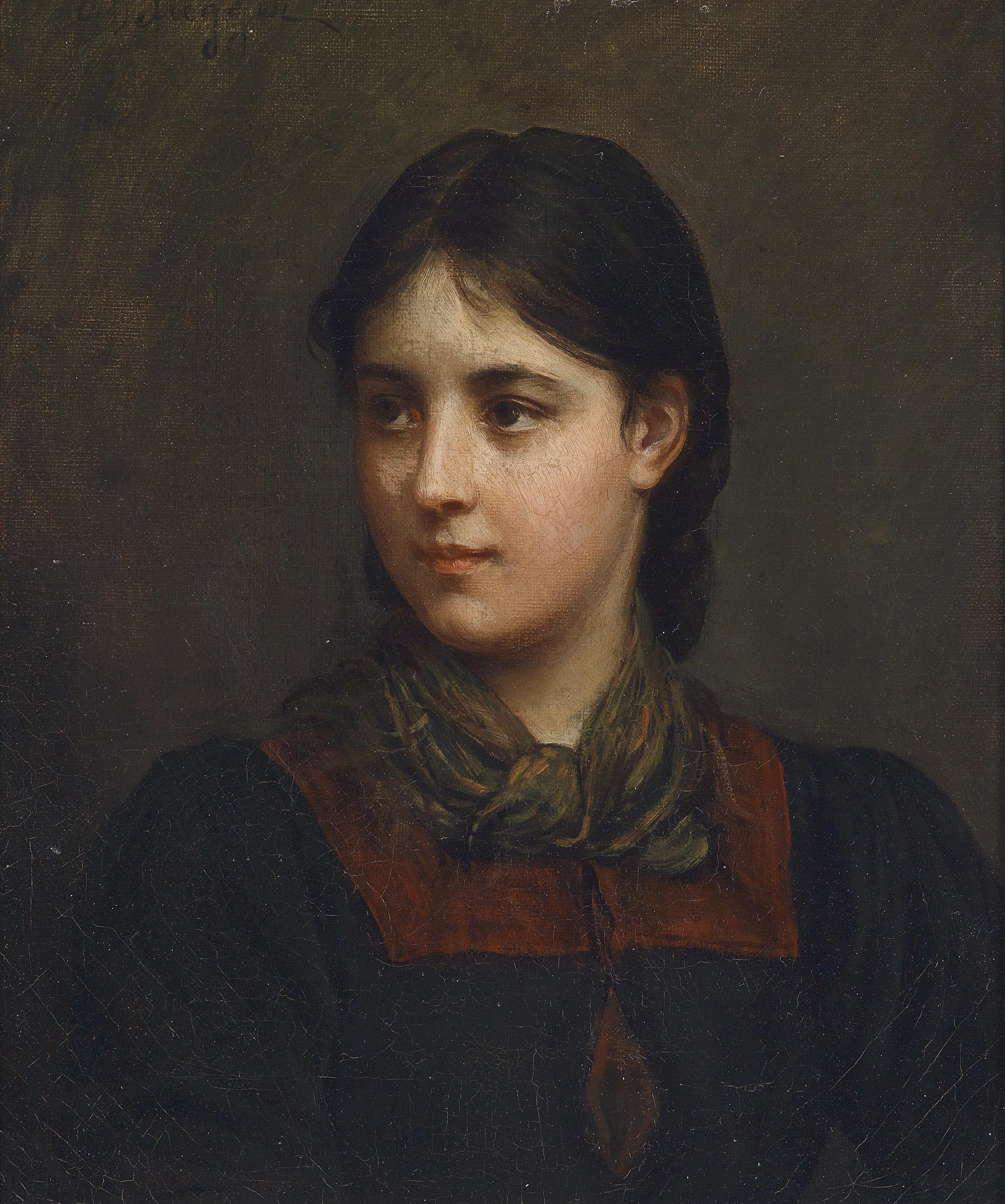
Dirndl

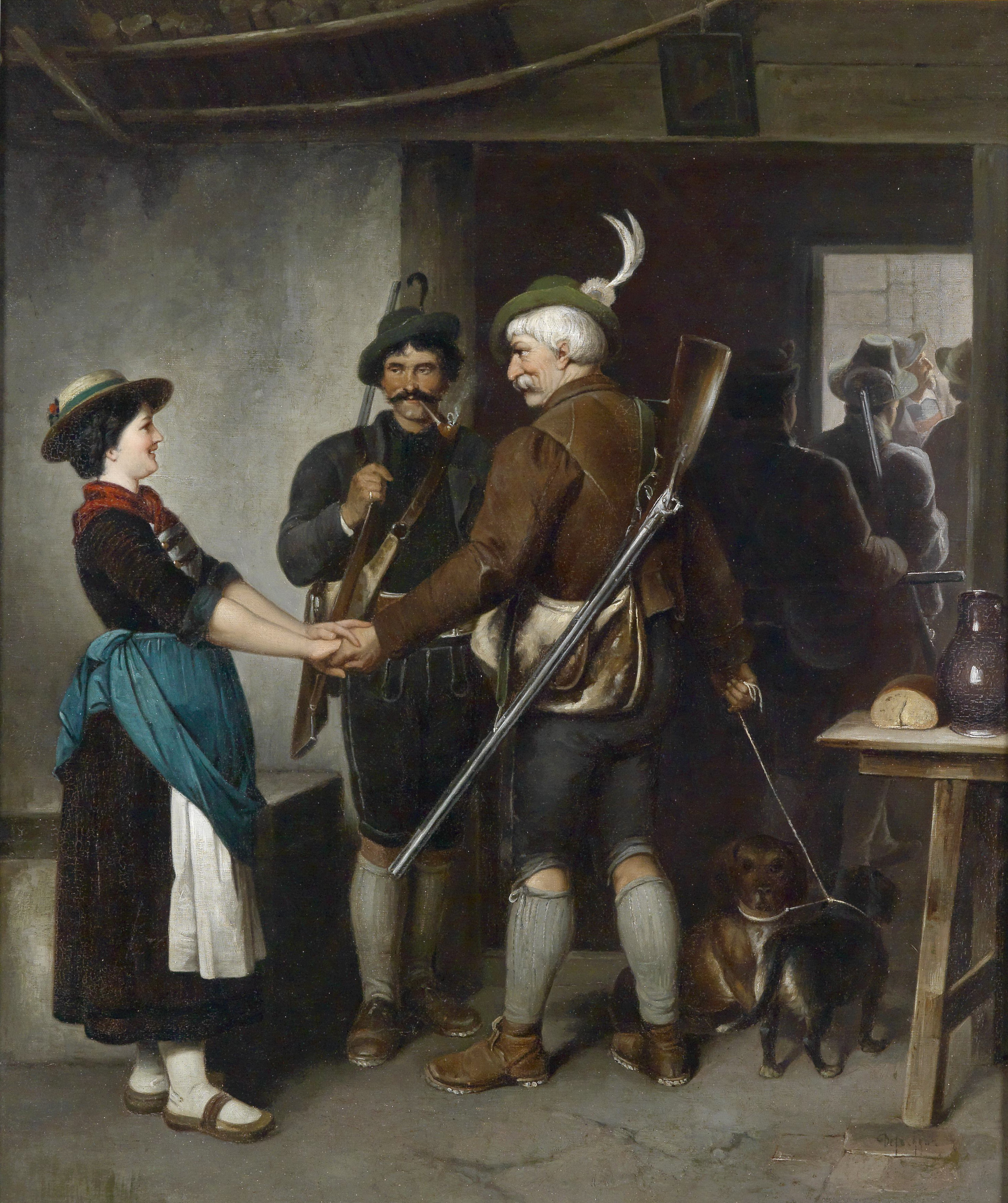
Farewell to the Hunters
