= Iselsberg-Stronach =

- Municipality
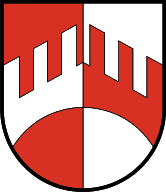
- Coat of arms

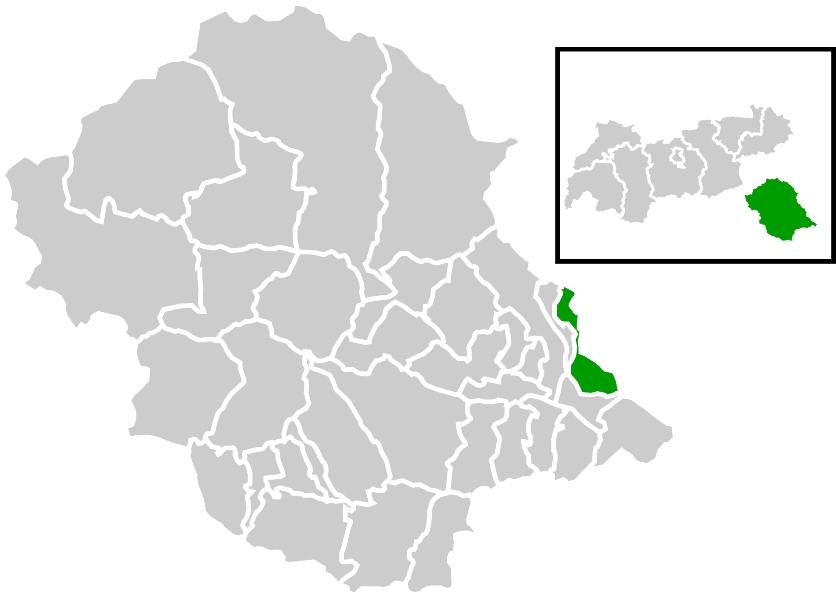
- Location within Lienz district

- Location within Austria
- Coordinates: 46°50′01″N 12°50′52″E
- Country: Austria
- State: Tyrol
- District: Lienz

Government
  - Mayor: Gerhard Wallensteiner

Area
  - Total: 17.96 km^{2} (6.93 sq mi)
- Elevation: 1,117 m (3,665 ft)

Population (2018-01-01)
  - Total: 596
  - Density: 33.2/km^{2} (85.9/sq mi)
- Time zone: UTC+1 (CET)
  - Summer (DST): UTC+2 (CEST)
- Postal code: 9991
- Area code: 04852
- Vehicle registration: LZ

Iselsberg-Stronach is a municipality in the district of Lienz in Austrian state of Tyrol.

== Population ==
Historical population
Year	Pop.	±%
1869	334	—
1880	352	+5.4%
1890	308	−12.5%
1900	287	−6.8%
1910	300	+4.5%
1923	283	−5.7%
1934	314	+11.0%
1939	351	+11.8%
1951	395	+12.5%
1961	409	+3.5%
1971	490	+19.8%
1981	458	−6.5%
1991	501	+9.4%
2001	570	+13.8%
2011	617	+8.2%

== Climate ==
The Köppen Climate Classification subtype for this climate is Dfc/Dfb (continental subarctic climate), bordering extremely closely on a humid continental climate.

Climate data for Iselsberg
Month	Jan	Feb	Mar	Apr	May	Jun	Jul	Aug	Sep	Oct	Nov	Dec	Year
Record high °C (°F)	12.9 (55.2)	15.8 (60.4)	19.5 (67.1)	22.5 (72.5)	26.4 (79.5)	28.6 (83.5)	32.4 (90.3)	30.2 (86.4)	27.4 (81.3)	22.4 (72.3)	18.4 (65.1)	15.2 (59.4)	32.4 (90.3)
Mean daily maximum °C (°F)	1.7 (35.1)	3.3 (37.9)	6.6 (43.9)	10.4 (50.7)	15.4 (59.7)	18.7 (65.7)	21.5 (70.7)	21.1 (70.0)	17.4 (63.3)	11.8 (53.2)	5.2 (41.4)	1.9 (35.4)	11.3 (52.3)
Daily mean °C (°F)	−4.1 (24.6)	−3.2 (26.2)	0.4 (32.7)	4.1 (39.4)	9.2 (48.6)	12.3 (54.1)	14.6 (58.3)	14.0 (57.2)	10.2 (50.4)	5.3 (41.5)	−0.2 (31.6)	−3.1 (26.4)	5.0 (41.0)
Mean daily minimum °C (°F)	−8.1 (17.4)	−7.5 (18.5)	−3.9 (25.0)	−0.5 (31.1)	3.8 (38.8)	6.6 (43.9)	8.8 (47.8)	8.5 (47.3)	5.3 (41.5)	1.4 (34.5)	−3.7 (25.3)	−6.7 (19.9)	0.3 (32.5)
Record low °C (°F)	−24.1 (−11.4)	−20.2 (−4.4)	−18.8 (−1.8)	−12.6 (9.3)	−7.6 (18.3)	−1.7 (28.9)	−0.4 (31.3)	−1.1 (30.0)	−5.1 (22.8)	−13.3 (8.1)	−16.6 (2.1)	−24.9 (−12.8)	−24.9 (−12.8)
Average precipitation mm (inches)	31.4 (1.24)	30.2 (1.19)	43.1 (1.70)	53.0 (2.09)	89.4 (3.52)	105.6 (4.16)	134.6 (5.30)	116.7 (4.59)	98.0 (3.86)	100.7 (3.96)	76.9 (3.03)	52.4 (2.06)	932.0 (36.69)
Average snowfall cm (inches)	40.4 (15.9)	41.1 (16.2)	42.1 (16.6)	17.6 (6.9)	7.5 (3.0)	0.0 (0.0)	0.0 (0.0)	0.0 (0.0)	0.0 (0.0)	5.4 (2.1)	38.3 (15.1)	45.0 (17.7)	237.4 (93.5)
Source: Weatherbase
