= Academy of Fine Arts, Nuremberg =

Art school in Nuremberg, Germany

Coordinates: 49°26′47.33″N 11°8′10.45″E

Academy of Fine Arts Nuremberg
- Akademie der Bildenden Künste in Nürnberg
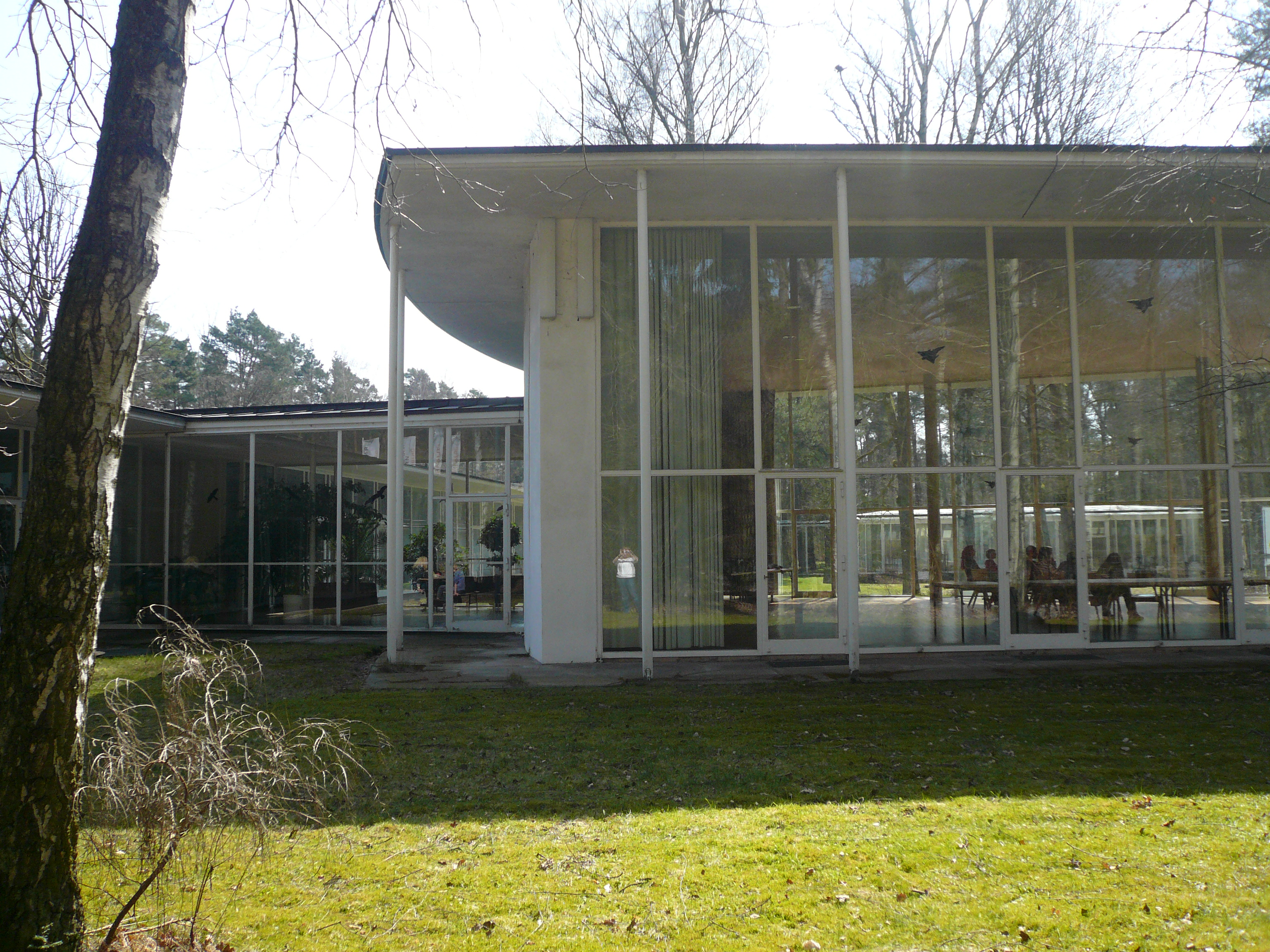
- AdBK Aula
- Type: Public
- Established: 1662; 364 years ago
- Rector: Holger Felten
- Students: c. 300
- Location: Nuremberg, Bavaria, Germany
- Campus: urban
- Website: www.adbk-nuernberg.de

The Academy of Fine Arts Nuremberg (German: Akademie der Bildenden Künste Nürnberg) was founded in 1662 by Jacob von Sandrart and is the oldest art academy in German-speaking Central Europe.

The art academy is situated in Nuremberg.

Classes include studies in fine arts, sculpture, visual arts, painting, artistic concepts, art education, gold- and silversmithing, as well as graphic design. There are master courses in Architecture and Urban Studies, and Art and Public Space.

Teaching takes place today in an ensemble of transparent pavilions that were designed by German architect Sep Ruf and have been classified as an historical monument. Located at the edge of the city, the campus offers an intensive work atmosphere. In the exhibition hall of the Academy and in the Gallery of the Academy, young artists publicly present their work. In addition to the main location in Nuremberg's Zerzabelshof district, the college has been using space in the historical imperial castle in Lauf since 1985 as a branch location in which to accommodate the art education and art pedagogy classes.

Partnerships with art-universities in Western and Eastern Europe—Hungarian University of Fine Arts, Academy of Fine Arts, Helsinki, Jan Matejko Academy of Fine Arts – Kraków, Palermo, Riga, Sassari, Urbino, University of Applied Arts Vienna, Academy of Fine Arts Vienna—make it possible for students to complete part of their course of study abroad.

== Notable students and professors ==
- Herbert Achternbusch
- Peter Angermann (1966–1968), professor 2002–2010
- Ernst von Bandel
- Willem van Bemmel
- Diego Bianconi
- Kathrin Böhm
- Gabriela Dauerer
- Otto Eckmann (1882–1885)
- Martin Eder (1993–1995)
- Rudolf Koch
- Georg Goldberg
- Johannes Götz
- Carl Haag
- Adolf von Hildebrand
- Karl Jäger
- Friedrich August von Kaulbach
- August von Kreling, director 1853–1874
- Richard Lindner
- Johann Daniel Preissler
- Michael Mathias Prechtl
- Johann Daniel Preissler,
- Karl Raupp, professor 1868–1879
- Paul Ritter
- August Johann Rösel von Rosenhof
- Sep Ruf
- Jacob von Sandrart
- Diet Sayler
- Juergen Teller
- Georg Philipp Wörlen
- Wolfgang Herrndorf
- Susanne Kühn
