= August von Kreling =

German sculptor (1818–1876)

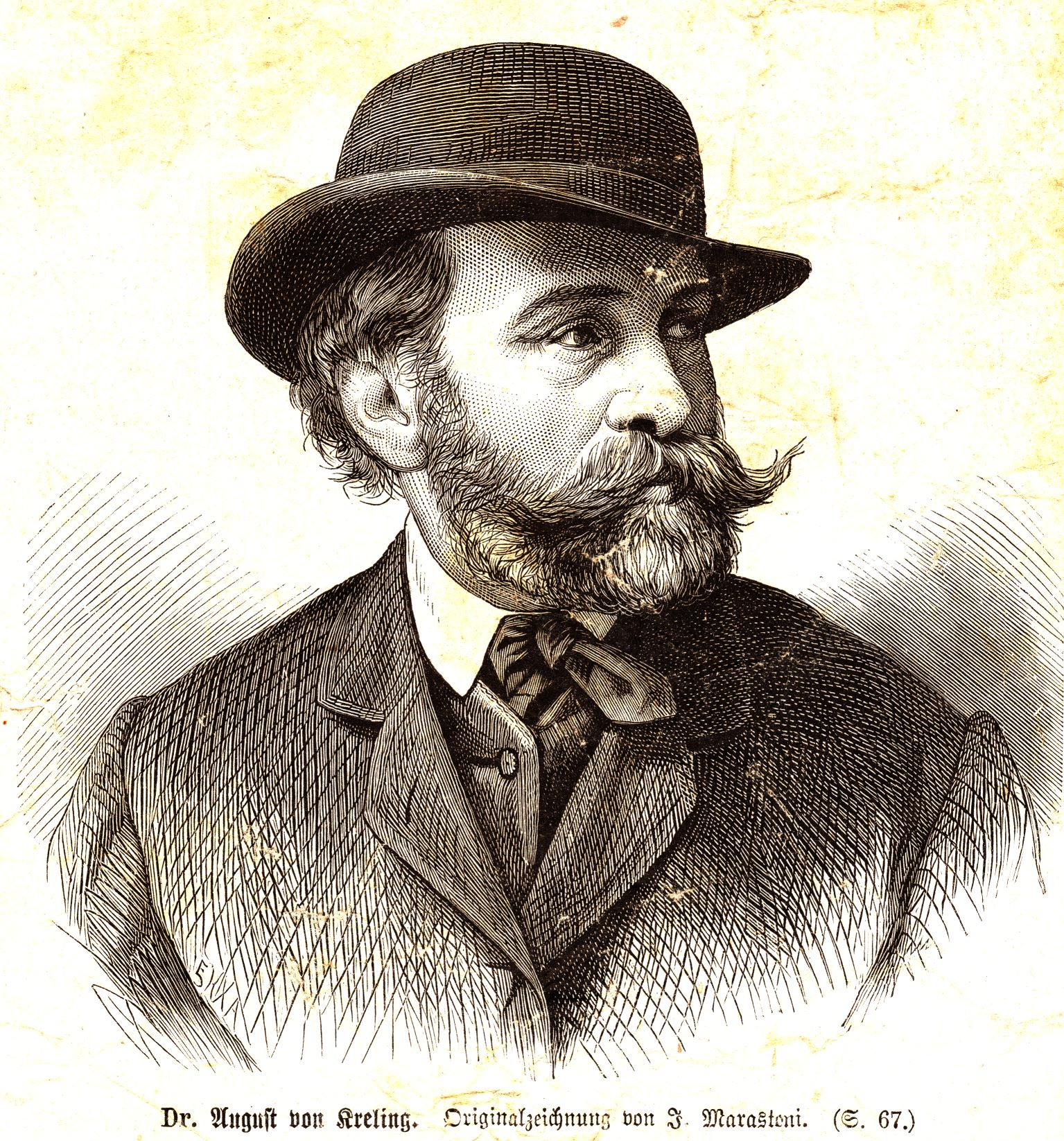
August von Kreling (ca. 1875)

August von Kreling (23 May 1818 – 23 April 1876) was a German sculptor and painter born in Osnabrück. He studied with Peter von Cornelius, and in 1853 became director of the Academy of Fine Arts Nuremberg. He became a member of the Munich Academy in 1876, and died in Nuremberg in that same year.

== Commissions ==
- His best-known commission in the United States was the Tyler Davidson Fountain, Cincinnati, Ohio, 1871
