= Hermann Anschütz =

German painter and professor (1802–1880)

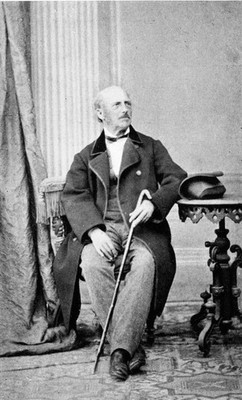
- Born: 12 October 1802; Koblenz, Rhin-et-Moselle, First French Republic
- Died: 30 August 1880 (aged 77); Munich, Kingdom of Bavaria, German Empire
- Known for: history painting

Hermann Anschütz (12 October 1802 – 30 August 1880) was a German painter and professor at the Royal Academy of Fine Arts in Munich. He is associated with the Düsseldorf school of painting.

Anschütz was born in Koblenz. His father Joseph Andreas Anschütz was an eminent musician and was in charge of a school for vocal and instrumental instruction, and Hermann's younger brother Karl Anschütz ended up as an opera conductor in the United States.

He lived at Promenade Straße 1 in Munich around 1850. He died in Munich, where he was buried on the Old Southern Cemetery (Alter Südfriedhof).

== See also ==
- List of German painters
