= Arthur von Ramberg =

German painter (1819–1875)

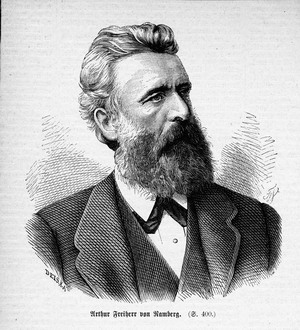

Arthur von Ramberg (4 September 1819 – 5 February 1875) was an Austrian-born painter who worked in Germany.

== Biography ==
He was born in Vienna. He studied art at Hanover and early made a tour in Italy, Hungary and Styria. In 1840, he attended the university at Prague, while at the same time uniting the pursuit of art with his other studies. In 1842, he became a pupil at the Art Academy of Dresden under Julius Hübner, and among other early pictures produced his Wedding of Dwarfs after Goethe, and The Emperor Henry I on His Hungarian Campaign.

In 1850, he went to Munich and executed a series of genre works illustrating the works of Schiller. In 1860, he was appointed professor to the Art School in Weimar, and six years later took a similar position in the Academy of Fine Arts, Munich. His subsequent productions include The Court of Frederick II in Palermo; and, among his genres, most notable are his Hermann and Dorothea after Goethe; and Luise, after the poem of Johann Heinrich Voss, which latter was much admired for its brilliancy in design and execution. He also frescoed the walls of Luther's chamber at Wartburg; and for the Grand Duchess of Saxe-Weimar illustrated the tale of the "King of the Frogs." He died in Munich in 1875.

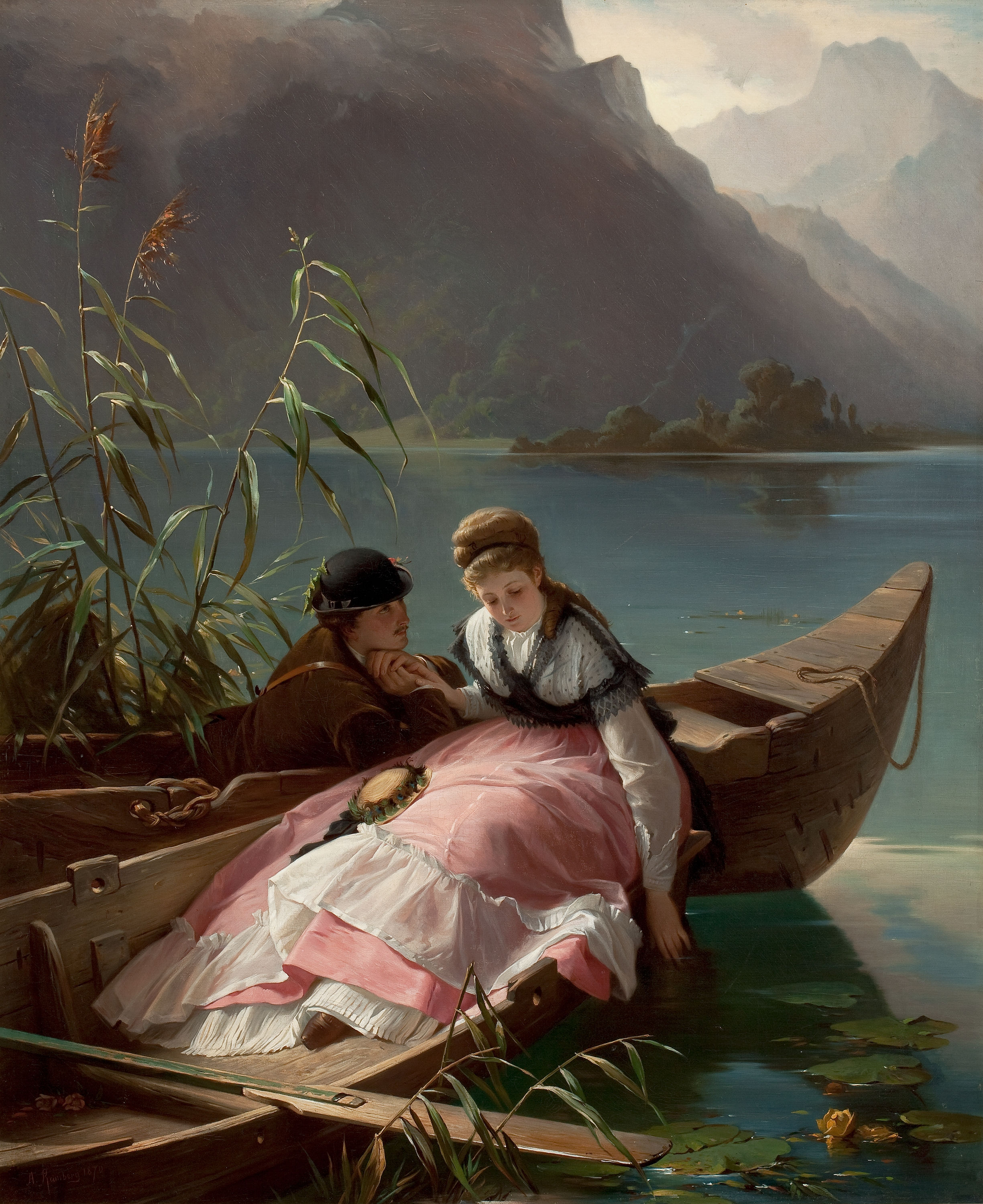
Rendezvous, 1870

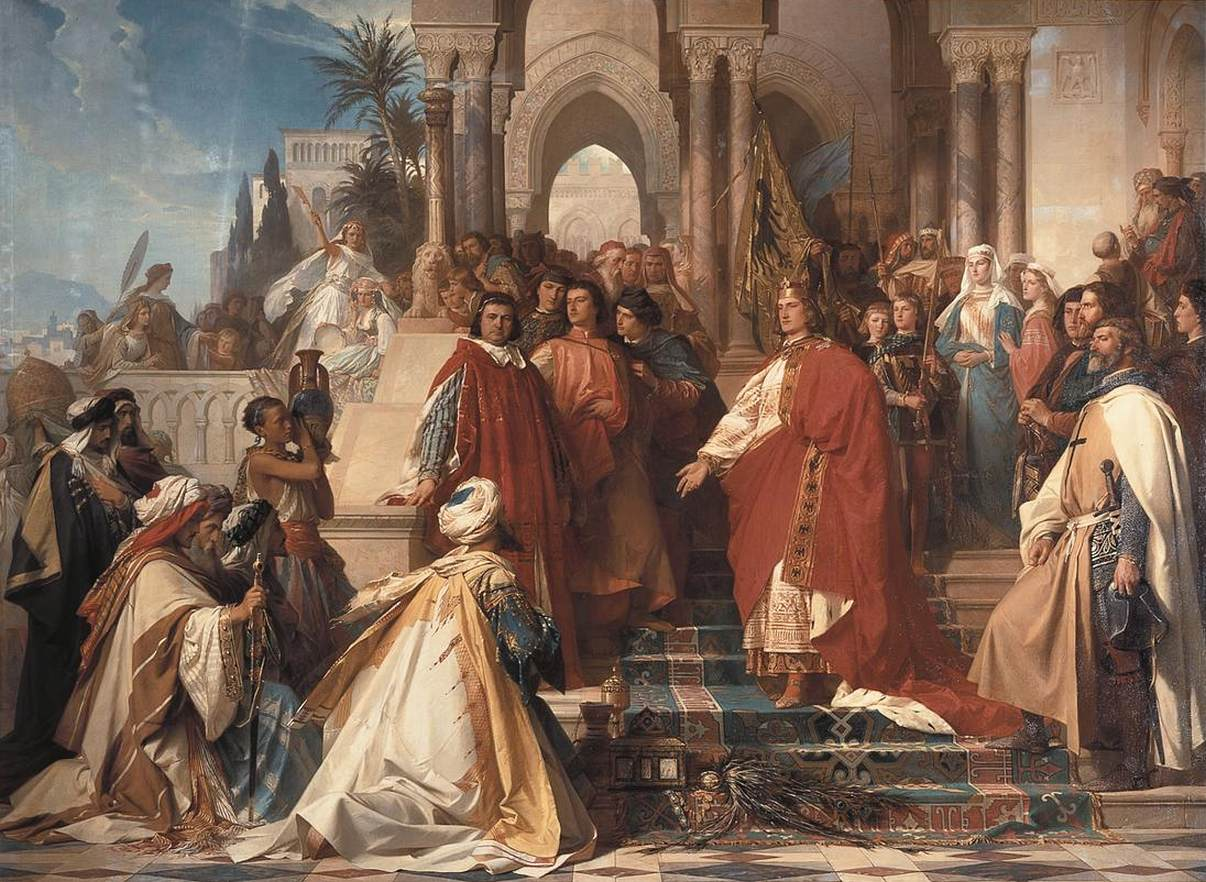
The Court of Emperor Frederick II in Palermo, 1865
