= Scholderer =

Scholderer is a surname. Notable people with the surname include:

- Otto Scholderer (1834–1902), German painter
- Victor Scholderer (1880–1971), German bibliographer
