= Louis Eysen =

German painter (1843 – 1899)

Louis Eysen (23 November 1843 – 21 July 1899) was a German landscape painter associated with the Leibl circle of Realist artists.

== Life and work ==
Eysen was born in Manchester. He came from a family that had been established in Frankfurt am Main since the 18th century. He was the second of five children born to Philipp Bernhard Eysen, a merchant in the silk dyeing trade, and his wife Auguste Wilhelmine Lemmé. In early 1850, the family returned to Frankfurt. Eysen's father died in 1853, and thanks to a generous inheritance, Eysen was able to enter the drawing class at the Städelschule in Frankfurt immediately after finishing school in 1861. He only took courses with Andreas Simons, the architecture lecturer. In addition, Eysen took private lessons with the history painter Friedrich Karl Hausmann and learned the art of woodcutting from the xylographer Andreas Stix. Until 1865, woodcut was the dominant art form for Eysen. Between 1865 and 1869, Eysen repeatedly undertook short trips with his friend and colleague Peter Burnitz to Berlin and Munich. According to his own account, Eysen visited all the important exhibitions during this period.

During one of his stays in Munich, he befriended the artist Victor Müller through whom he soon met Wilhelm Leibl and his circle. In 1869, he completed his studies at the Städelschule and went to Paris at the end of that same year. There he soon met Adolf Schreyer and Otto Scholderer. Through Scholderer, Eysen met the portraitist Léon Bonnat, with whom he completed a brief apprenticeship. It was also here that he was introduced to Gustave Courbet, whom he greatly admired. These influences and experiences confirmed Eysen's devotion to modern painting.

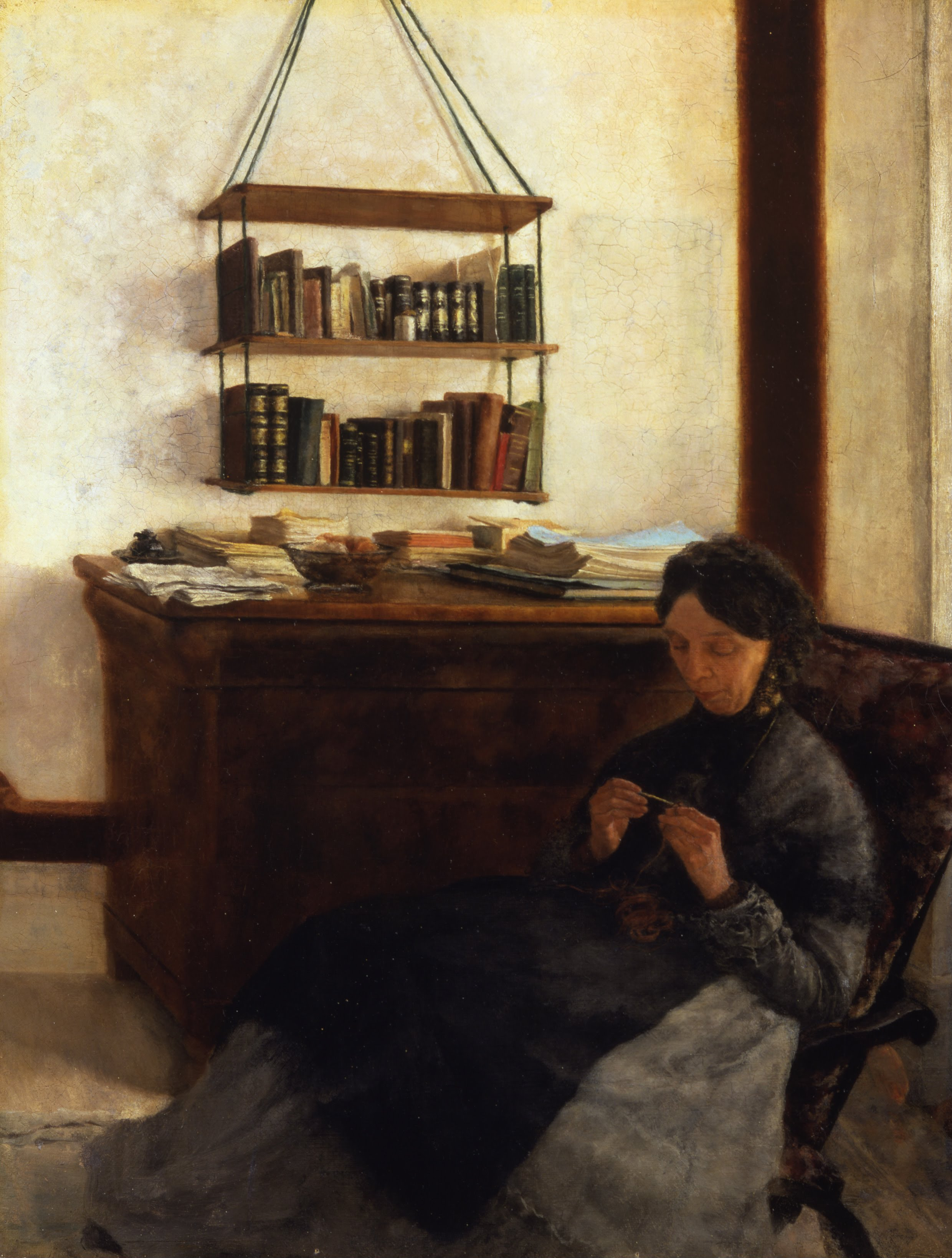
The Artist's Mother, 1877

When the Franco-Prussian War threatened in 1870, Eysen returned to Frankfurt am Main. Through Hans Thoma and Wilhelm Steinhausen, he maintained close contact with the Leibl circle. This exchange of ideas diminished in 1873 when Eysen settled in Kronberg im Taunus. Influenced by Leibl and Courbet, he was inspired daily by the landscape of the Taunus, and it was precisely through this subject that he joined the Kronberg artists' colony, which had been founded by Anton Burger.

In 1874, Eysen undertook a journey of several months to Florence and Rome, combining healing and art. Ill with a stomach ailment, he also spent the winter of 1876/77 in Italy, but this resulted in no improvement of his health.

Eysen settled in Merano in 1879 together with his mother and his sisters Mary and Emma. He had already come to appreciate this region the previous year: the favorable climate, which helped with his illness, and the landscape, ideal for painting. In the Obermais district of Merano, Eysen acquired the "Villa Holstein", and the family lived there for the next 20 years. Eysen lived a very secluded life and, as an artist, was extremely isolated. This solitude also meant that Eysen never initiated a "school" or taught students throughout his life. Even his correspondence with Thoma and Steinhausen gradually faded away.

As far as his health allowed, Eysen undertook extensive hikes in the surrounding area. Some of his landscape paintings were created in the Puster Valley and at Lake Garda. During his years in South Tyrol, Eysen only had two opportunities to exhibit his work: in 1888 at the exhibition of the Prussian Academy of Arts (Berlin) and in 1895 at the major art exhibition in the Munich Glass Palace.

The fact that he was completely ignored by art critics at both exhibitions deeply affected the artist, who was prone to self-doubt. From 1895 onwards, Eysen's health deteriorated steadily, to the point that he could hardly paint anymore. In the summer of 1899, he had to undergo an operation. Eysen died of heart failure on 21 July 1899 in Munich at the age of 55.

In January 1900, his friends initiated a memorial exhibition, which was shown in Obermais. In response to the great interest, this exhibition was shown in Karlsruhe in the following years, where Hans Thoma strongly advocated for him. Afterwards, the exhibition was shown in Munich and Frankfurt. The tour concluded with an exhibition at the Galerie Keller & Reiner in Berlin. Almost his entire artistic output was on display, comprising approximately 180 paintings in addition to some drawings and woodcuts.

== Style ==
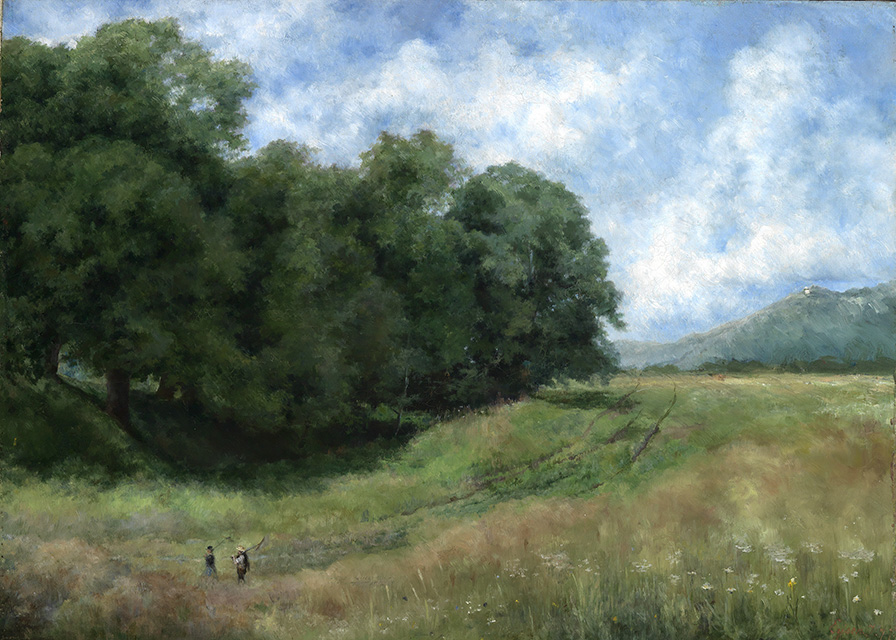
Path in Kronberg im Taunus (1877)

Eysen almost exclusively preferred small formats for his paintings. His extremely meticulous painting style and his ever-present self-doubt prevented him from working on any of the larger formats so characteristic of painting at that time. Landscape was his preferred subject. Influenced by the Munich Realism of the Leibl circle and the new direction of the School of Barbizon, he managed to find a style of his own at an early age.

One of his rare portraits, The Artist's Mother (1877), is described by the art historian Angelika Wesenberg as "surprisingly modern" in the way the woman's dress and the chair in which she sits are cut off by the edges of the picture, as they might be in a casual snapshot.

== Works ==
- Frau mit Schirm in Landschaft
- Schneeschmelze im Vorfrühling
- Südtiroler Landschaft
- Wiesengrund
- Obstgarten

== Bibliography ==
- Eva Knels: Eysen, Louis In: Savoy, Bénédicte und Nerlich, France (Hrsg.): Pariser Lehrjahre. Ein Lexikon zur Ausbildung deutscher Maler in der französischen Hauptstadt. Band 2: 1844–1870. Berlin/Boston 2015.
- Margarete Braun-Ronsdorf (1959). "Eysen, Louis". Neue Deutsche Biographie (in German). Vol. 4. Berlin: Duncker & Humblot. pp. 711–712. (full text online).
- Hanny Franke (Hrsg.): Louis Eysen, ein Frankfurter Maler. Hanny-Franke-Archiv, Eschborn 1978.
- F. D. Innerhofer: Der Maler Louis Eysen, in: Zeitschrift des Ferdinandeums für Tirol und Vorarlberg. 1904, S. 304 ff.
- Wilhelm Petzet (Hrsg.): Wilhelm Leibl und sein Kreis. Ausstellungskatalog, Städtische Galerie im Lenbachhaus München, 25. Juli bis 29. September 1974. Prestel, München 1974, ISBN 3-7913-0087-3.
- Siegfried de Rachewiltz (Hrsg.): Louis Eysen (1843–1899) und Meran. Ausstellungskatalog, Landesmuseum Schloß Tirol, 25. März – 29. Juni 1997. Athesia, Bozen 1997.
- Wilhelm Dieter Vogel (Hrsg.): Louis Eysen (1843–1899). Das zeichnerische Werk. Kunsthandlung Schneider, Frankfurt am Main 2000.
- Wilhelm Dieter Vogel (Hrsg.): Louis Eysen. Briefe an Wilhelm Steinhausen, Hans Thoma und an seine Familie. Übertragen, geordnet und herausgegeben von Wilhelm Dieter Vogel. Steinhausen-Stiftung, Frankfurt am Main 2009, ISBN 978-3-00-027752-8.
- Werner Zimmermann: Der Maler Louis Eysen. Kramer, Frankfurt am Main 1963.
