= Alexander Lewin =

German Jewish entrepreneur and art collector persecuted by the Nazis

Alexander Lewin (August 18, 1879 in Vienna – 1942 in Switzerland) was a German Jewish entrepreneur and art collector who was persecuted and plundered by the Nazis.

== Early life ==
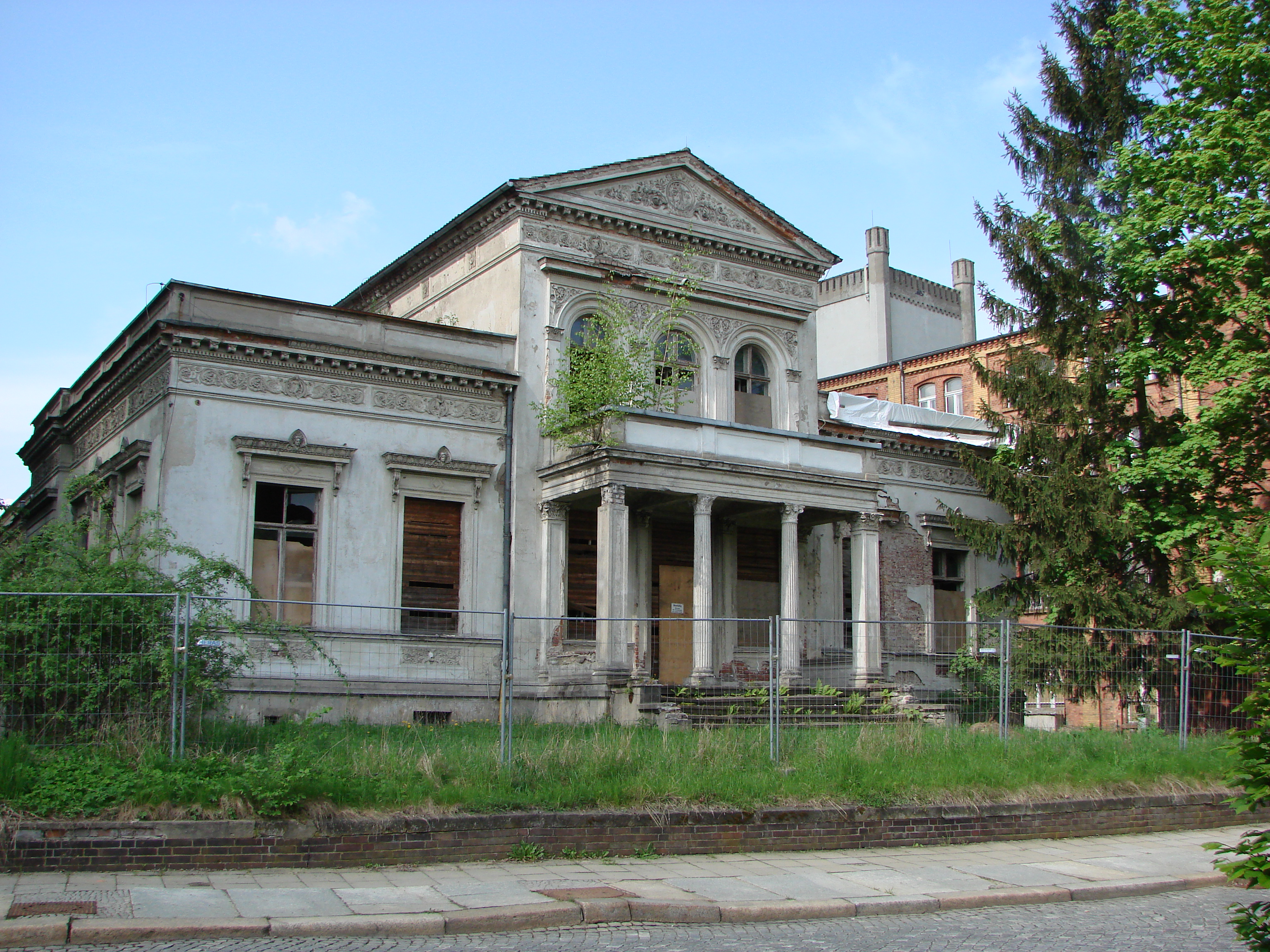
Cohn's villa in Guben, residence of the Lewin family until 1938

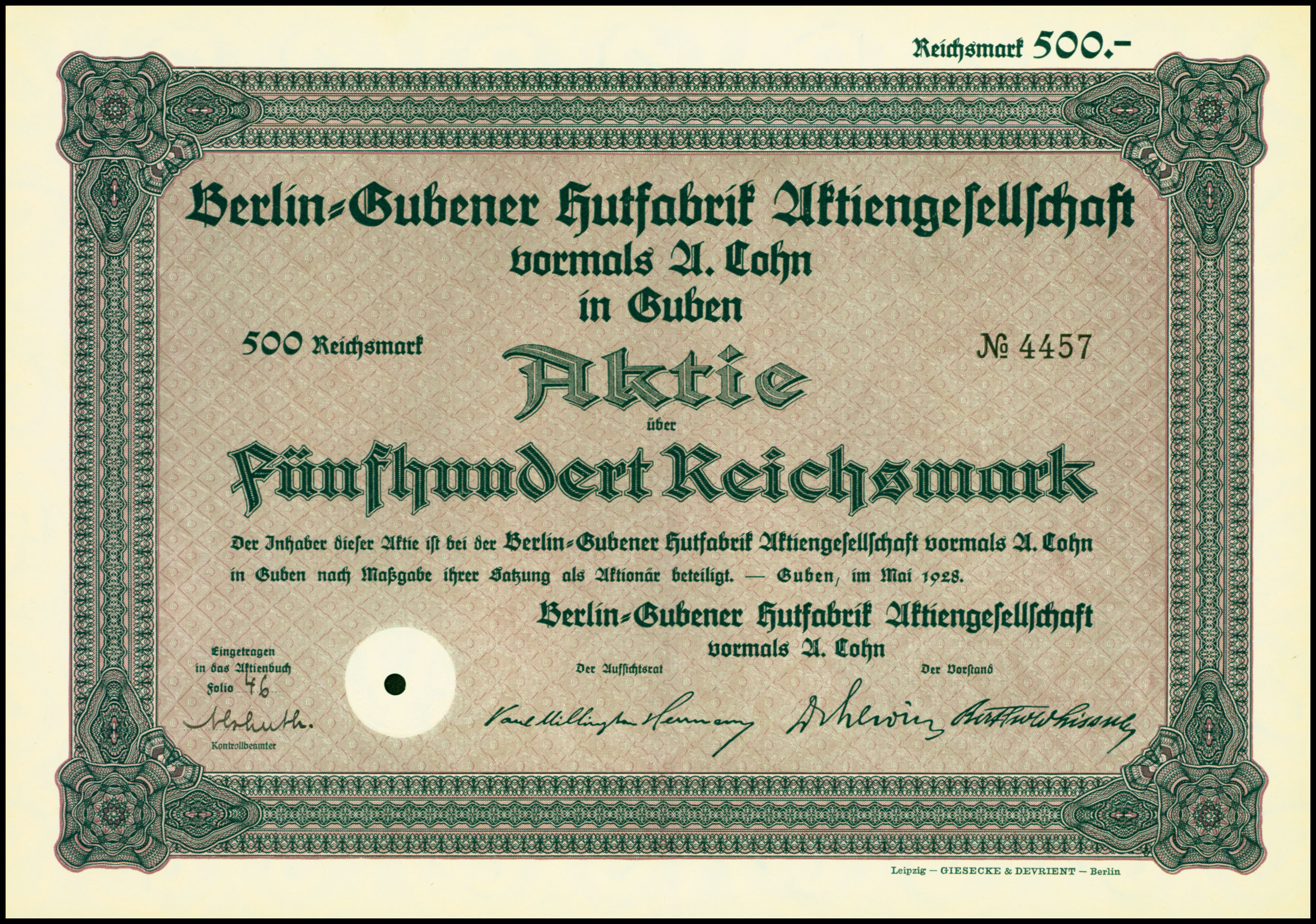
Share in Berlin-Gubener Hutfabrik AG from May 1928 with the signature of board member Alexander Lewin

Alexander Lewin, who was born in Vienna, studied law and obtained a doctorate. He joined the family business, the Berlin-Gubener Hutfabrik AG, vorm. A. Cohn, a. His father Hermann Lewin and his uncle Apelius Cohn founded their first hat factory in Berlin in 1859, to which a branch in Guben was added in 1876. After the death of his father Hermann Lewin in 1920, Alexander Lewin took over the management of the company as general director and board member. By 1922 the company was the largest hat manufacturer in Germany by 1922, employing more than 4,000 people in 1928.

Lewin also served as honorary consul for Portugal and member of the foreign trade committee of the Reich Association of German Industry. From1928 he was President of the Chamber of Commerce and Industry for Lower Lusatia in Cottbus.

== Nazi persecution ==
After the National Socialists came to power in 1933, the Lewin family was persecuted because of its Jewish origins. Despite being unanimously re-elected on March 6, 1933, chairman of the Cottbus Chamber of Commerce and Industry, Lewin had to give up this post a month later due to pressure from the Nazis. In September 1938 he resigned from his position on the board of the Berlin-Gubener Hutfabrik AG. In March 1939, all of his assets in Germany were blocked and on August 4, 1941, the Reich Minister of the Interior revoked his German citizenship and his property was confiscated. Alexander Lewin died as a refugee in Switzerland in 1942 at the age of 63.

== Art collection ==
Alexander Lewin built an important art collection, which included 19th century German art and works of French Impressionism and Post-Impressionism. Lewin was forced to leave them behind in Guben to be confiscated by Nazi authorities. Two artworks were transferred to the collection of Hitler's planned Führermuseum in Linz and came into the possession of the Federal Republic of Germany after the war.

Artwork from Lewin's collection ended up in different museums and private collections throughout the world. Some examples of where they ended up (and which specific artworks) include:

- Switzerland, in the collection of the arms dealer Emil Bührle (now the Foundation EG Bührle Collection, Zurich):
  - Smokers and Absinthe Drinkers by Honoré Daumier
  - Self-portrait by Vincent van Gogh
- In Los Angeles, at the Armand Hammer Museum of Art:
  - Alice Legouvé in the Armchair by Édouard Manet
- In Copenhagen, at the Ny Carlsberg Glyptotek:
  - Portrait d'homme, bathing women by Paul Cézanne
- In Germany, in the Staatliche Kunsthalle Karlsruhe:
  - A view of the Sea at l'Estaque by Paul Cézanne
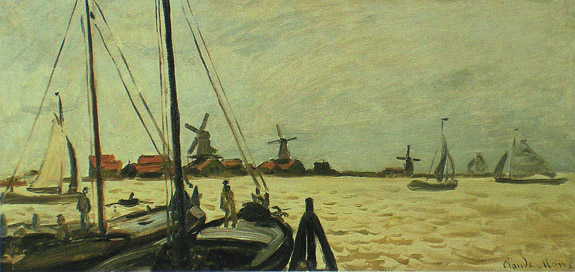
Claude Monet:
Les Bords de la Zaan, 1871

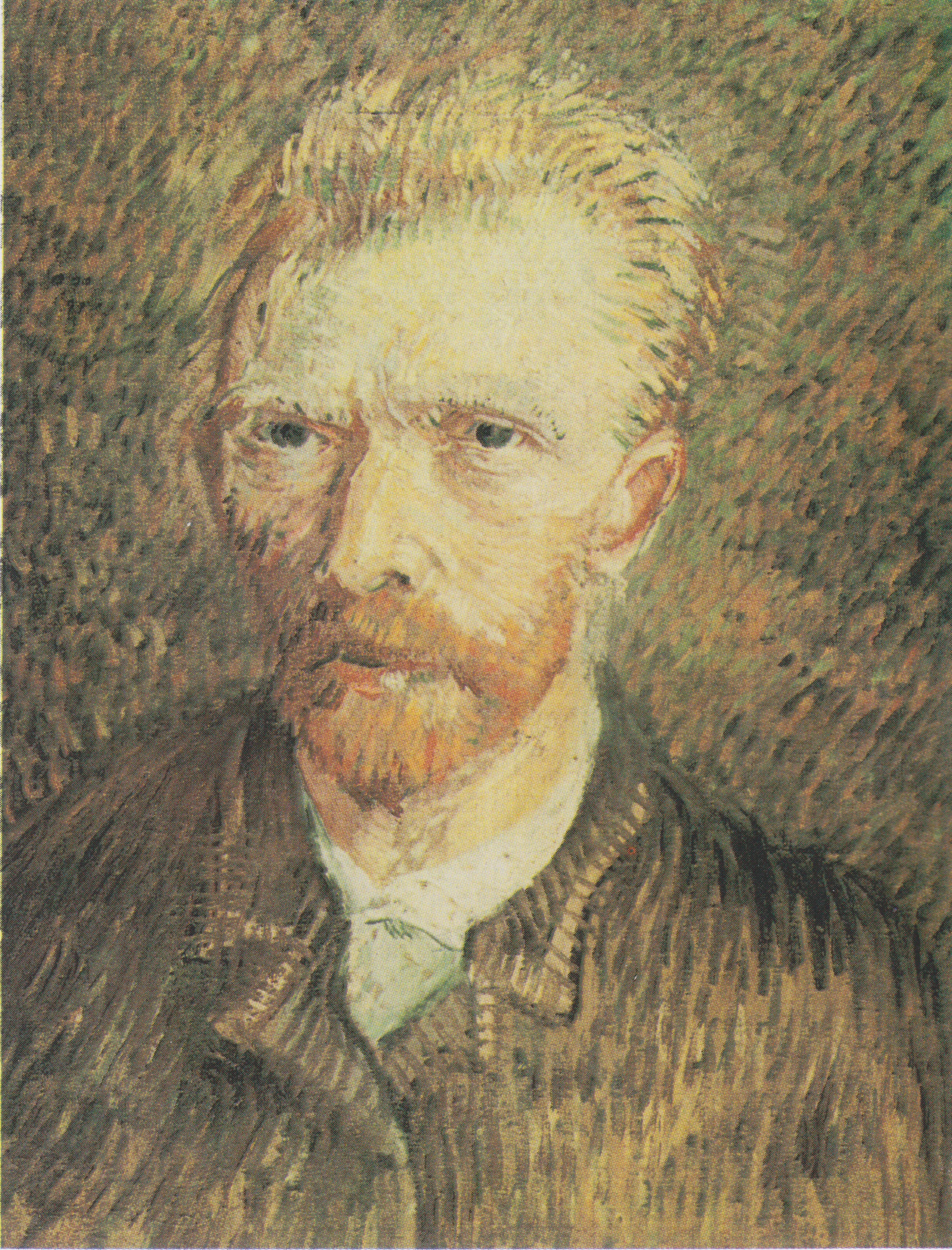
Vincent van Gogh:
Selbstbildnis, 1887/88

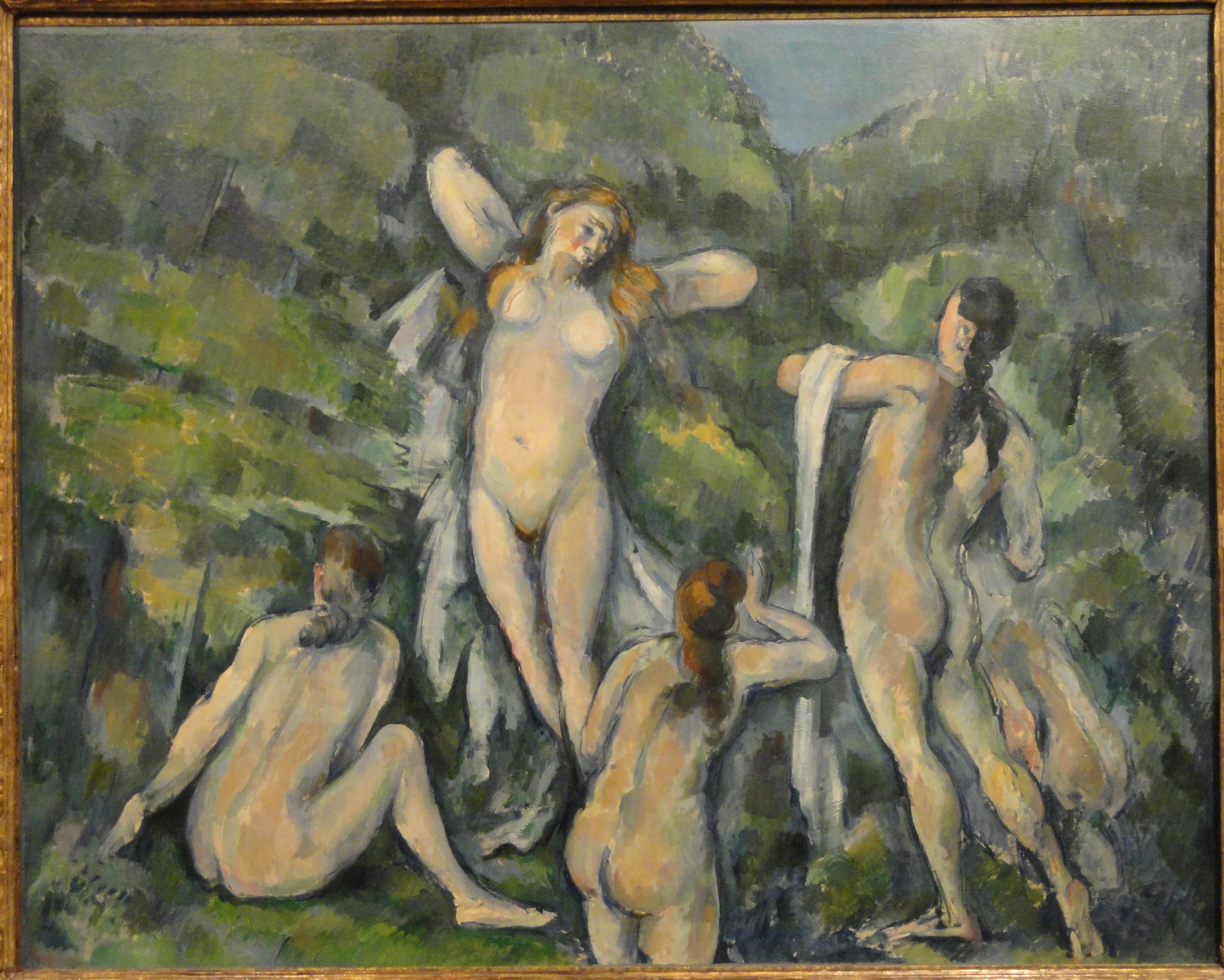
Paul Cézanne:
Badende Frauen, um 1900

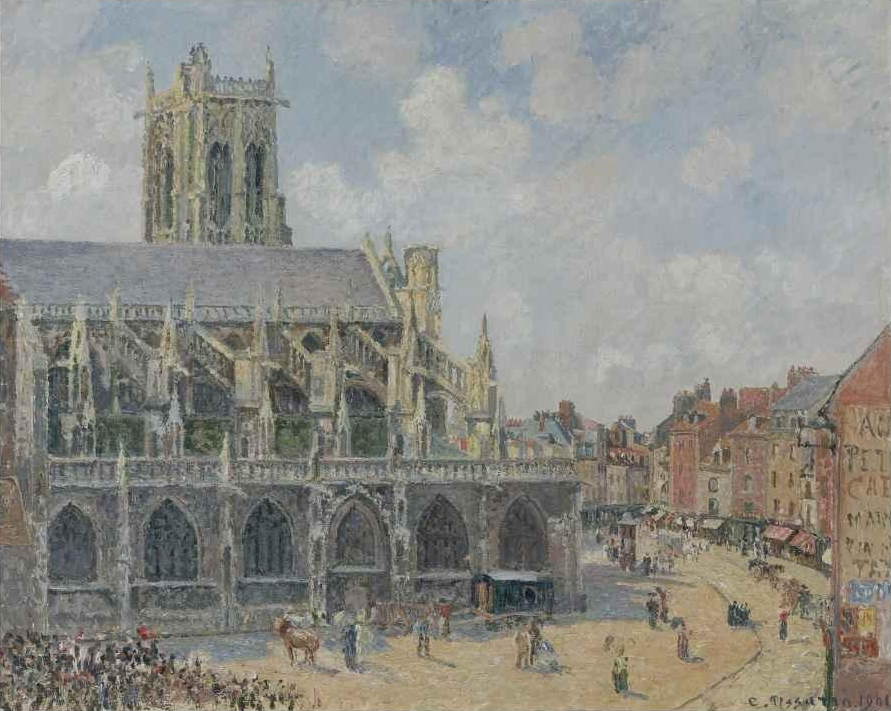
Camille Pissarro:
L’Église Saint-Jacques à Dieppe, soleil, matin, 1901

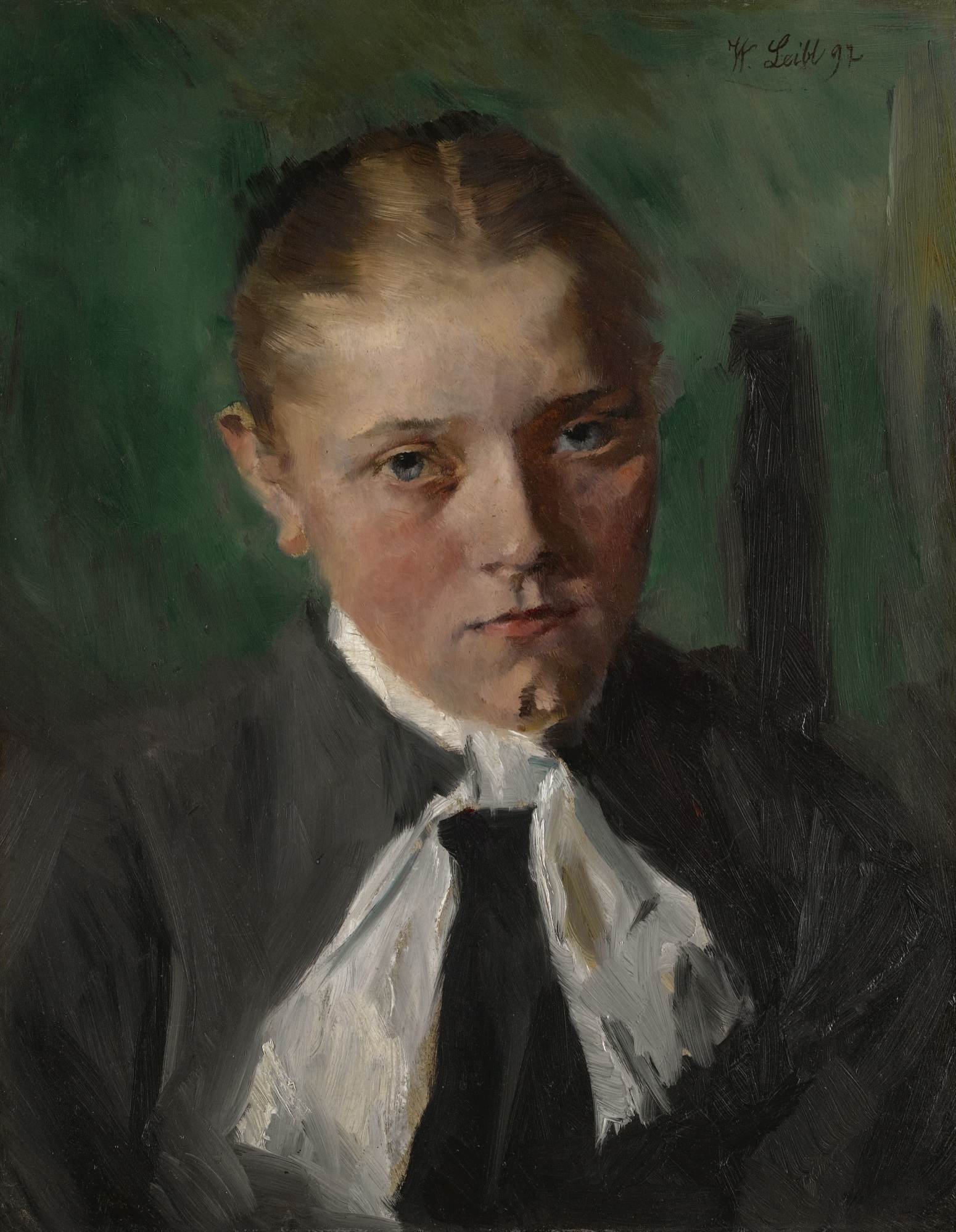
Wilhelm Leibl:
Bauernmädchen, 1897

== Claims for restitution ==
Several of Lewin's artworks were restituted to his heirs. In 2009, Peasant Girl Without a Hat by artist Wilhelm Leibl was restituted to the Lewin heirs. Farmer's Girl (also Farmer's Girl without a Hat with a White Scarf) by Wilhelm Leibl had been on permanent loan to the Kunsthalle Bremen, and the painting Two Cows in the Pasture under Pollarded Willows by Heinrich von Zügel, had been in the possession of Wörth am Rhein.

== Literature ==
- Thomas Flemming: Zwischen Historie und Herausforderung. Die IHK Cottbus 1851–2001. Industrie- und Handelskammer Cottbus, Cottbus 2001, ISBN 3-00-008410-X.
- Esther Tisa Francini, Anja Heuß, Georg Kreis: Fluchtgut – Raubgut. Der Transfer von Kulturgütern in und über die Schweiz 1933−1945 und die Frage der Restitution. (= Veröffentlichungen der Unabhängigen Expertenkommission Schweiz – Zweiter Weltkrieg, Band 1.) Chronos, Zürich 2001, ISBN 3-0340-0601-2.
- Hans Jucker, Theodor Müller, Eduard Hüttinger: Sammlung Emil G. Bührle. Kunsthaus Zürich, Zürich 1958.
- Chapeau, Das Westalgäu behütet die Welt, Die Geschichte der Hutprodukrion in Lindenberg und Umgebung 9. März 2015 von Georg Grübel (Author), Klaus Gietinger (Author), Manfred Röhrl (Author)

== See also ==
- Aryanization
- List of Claims for Restitution of Nazi-looted Art
- Emil Georg Bührle
- The Holocaust
