= Three Women in Church =

Painting by Wilhelm Leibl

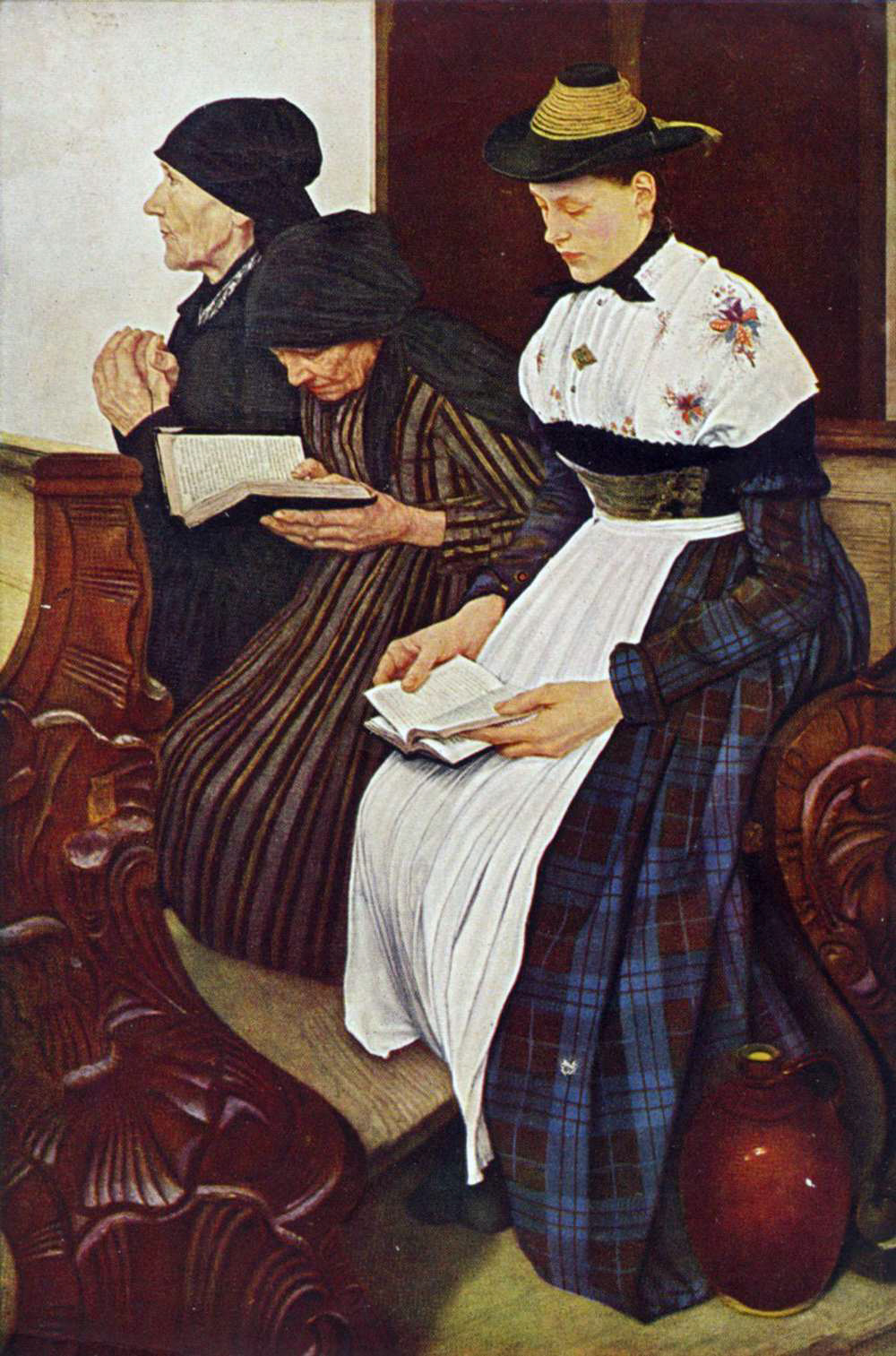
- Artist: Wilhelm Leibl
- Year: 1881
- Medium: oil on mahogany
- Dimensions: 113 cm × 77 cm (44 in × 30 in)
- Location: Kunsthalle Hamburg, Hamburg

Three Women in Church (German: Die drei Frauen in der Kirche) is an 1881 oil painting by the German realist painter Wilhelm Leibl which is in the collection of the Kunsthalle Hamburg.

== History and description ==
The painting depicts three generations of German peasants sitting together in a pew at the village church in Berbling near Bad Aibling, Bavaria. Leibl had left his previous base in Munich to live amongst the people of the countryside and record their everyday life. This work followed a series of such paintings and was the high point of his artistic career, taking some three and a half years to complete. The three women featured in the work were modelled by locals and the painting carried out in situ in the church.

A problem arose when the church pastor died in 1878 shortly after work on the painting began and his replacement refused permission for Leibl to continue. Only the intervention of Luitpold, the Prince Regent of Bavaria, overcame the difficulty. Leibl also had to deal with the problem of capturing the detail of the women's features and clothing in his realistic style in the gloom of a country church and with problems of perspective which meant that the women's hands were made disproportionately large.

== See also ==
- 100 Great Paintings, 1980 BBC series
