= Victor Müller =

German painter

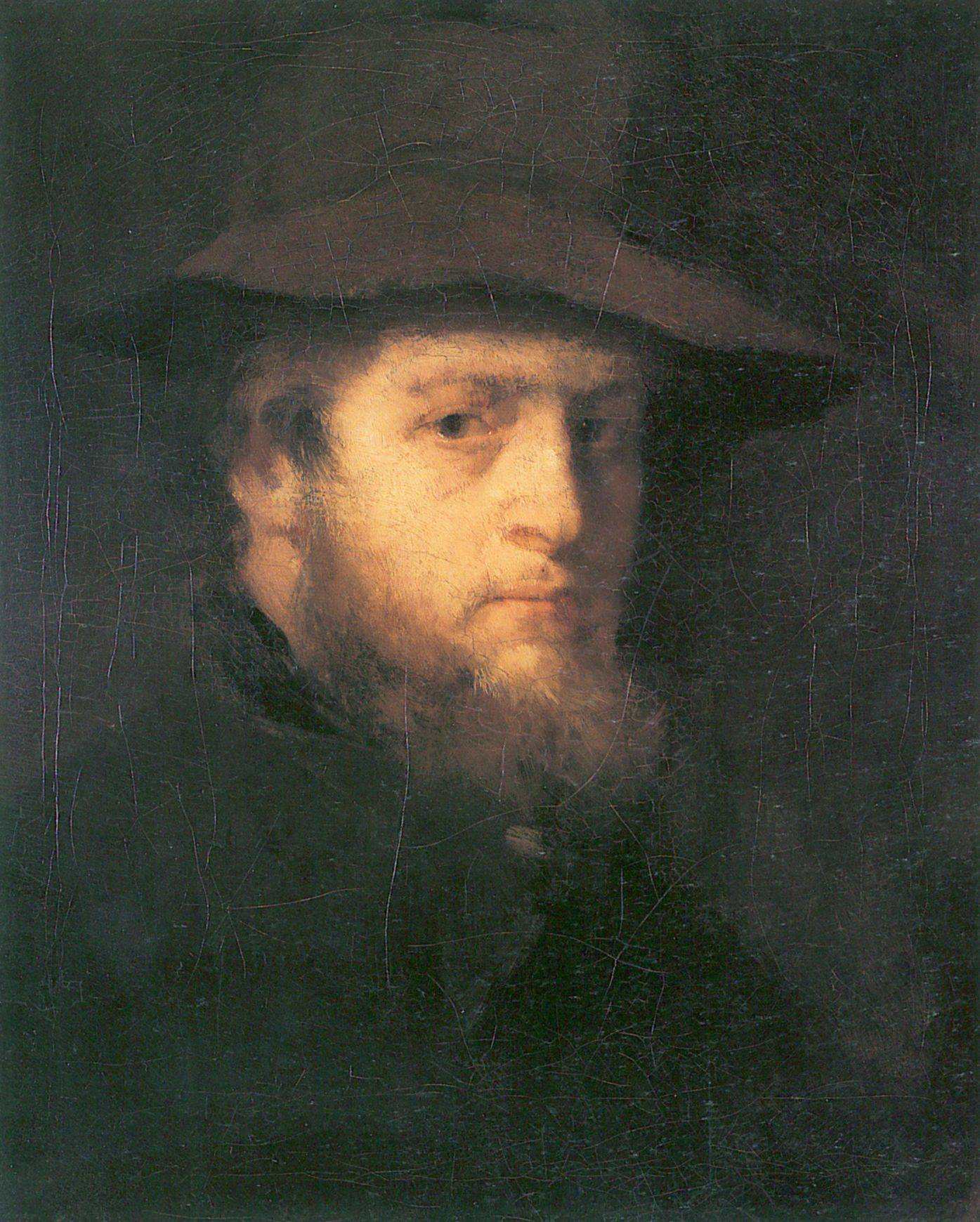
- Portrait by Wilhelm Leibl c. 1870
- Born: 24 March 1829; Free City of Frankfurt
- Died: 21 December 1871 (aged 42); Munich, Kingdom of Bavaria, German Empire

Victor Müller (29 March 1829 – 21 December 1871 was a German painter.

== Biography ==
Müller was born in the Free City of Frankfurt. Beginning his artistic studies under Steinle at the Frankfurt art school, he continued them at Antwerp and ultimately went to Paris (1849), where he stayed for 11 years, diligently studying the methods and manner of Thomas Couture, Eugène Delacroix, and Gustave Courbet. He became a follower of Courbet, whose technique, the reverse of Couture's, he adopted, and subsequently helped to promote in Germany.

In 1858 he returned to Frankfurt, where he soon attracted attention with a series of pictures, thoroughly realistic in conception and of great coloristic charm, but scarcely understood by a public accustomed to the sentimental trend of the Düsseldorf school of that period. Therefore, he moved to Munich in 1866, where revolutionary departures from traditional treatment as the “Sleeping Wood-Nymph” (1863), or “Hero and Leander,” were more likely to be appreciated. For the castle of Kronberg in the Taunus, he painted a series of scenes from the history of Baron Hartmuth von Kronberg. He also produced his famous “Hero und Leander.”

Following these works came “Hamlet mit Horatio auf dem Friedhof” (“Hamlet with Horatio in the Churchyard”), “Ophelia am Bach” (“Ophelia by the brook”), “Romeo und Julia”, and his last and unfinished work, “Faust auf dem Spaziergang” (“Faust on a Stroll”). Among his other works are “Waldnymphe” (“Wood nymph”), “Tannhäuser im Venusberg”, “Landschaftsszene aus Victor Hugos Les misérables” (“A landscape from Victor Hugo's Les Misérables”). His last finished picture was “Blumenmädchen” (“Flower Girl”).

All of his works are distinguished by a certain literary or poetic character which appeals to the fancy like a strain of lyric music, although the coloring sometimes runs in its vividness to the verge of extravagance.

He married Ida Scholderer, the sister of Otto Scholderer, in 1868.

== Legacy ==
To his influence as a colorist was due not only the introduction of the tone element into the paintings of the Munich School, but also the truer conception of historical characters and a more wholesome observation of nature among the younger generation of artists.

== Gallery ==
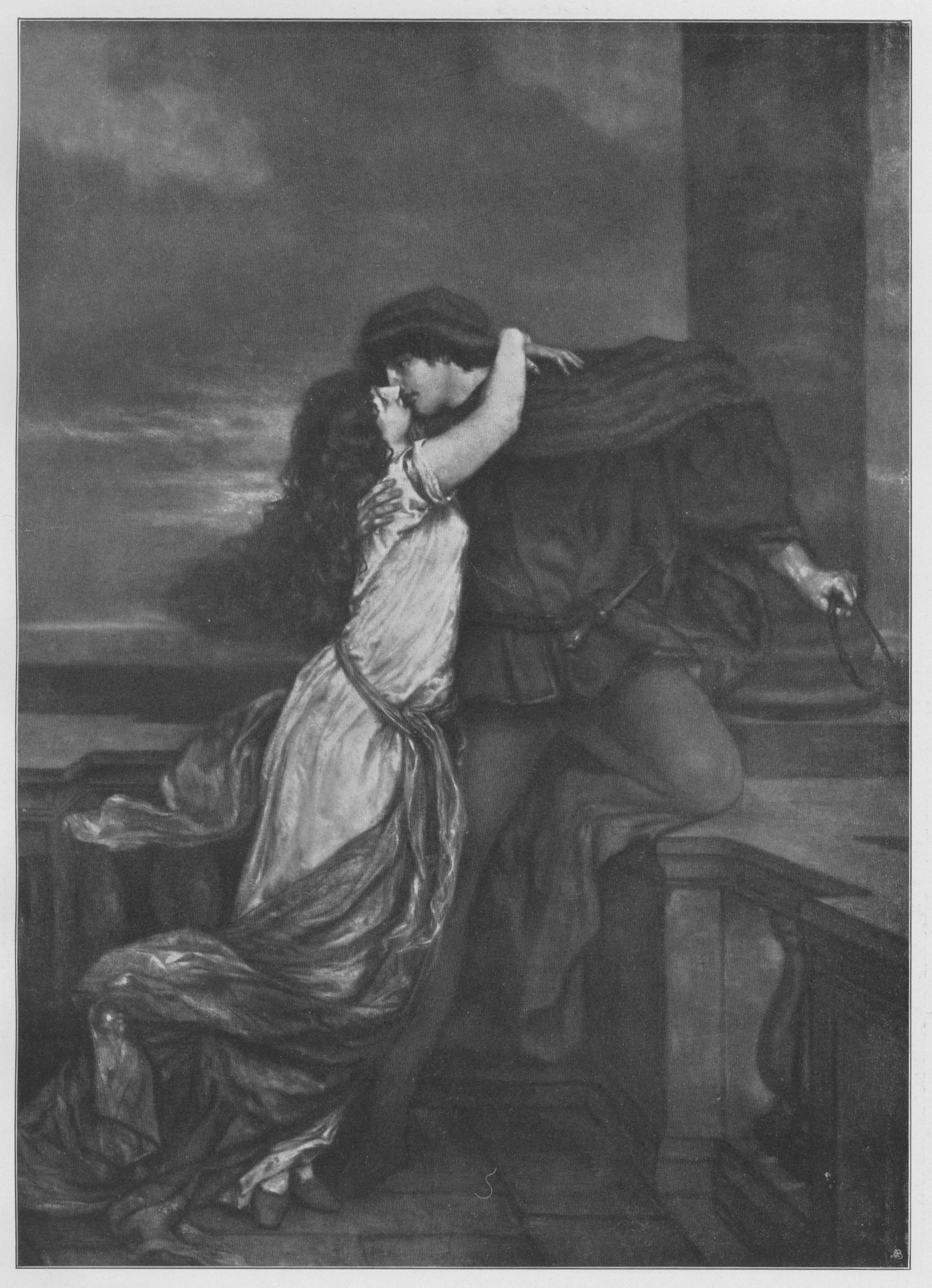
Romeo and Juliet

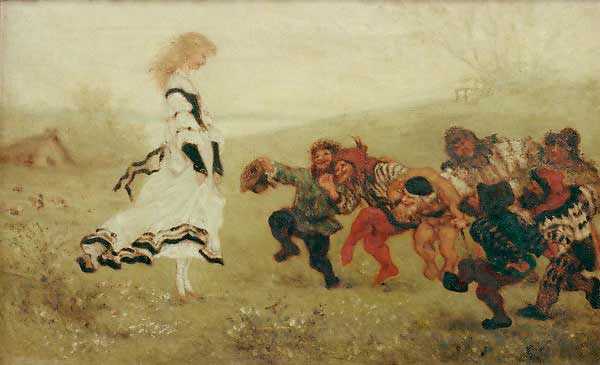
Snow White with the Seven Dwarfs
