= Victor Scholderer =

English bibliographer

Julius Victor Scholderer, CBE, FBA (9 October 1880 – 11 September 1971), usually known as Victor Scholderer, was a German bibliographer born in England.

Born in London to German parents, he was the son of the artist Otto Scholderer. Scholderer attended St Paul's School and Trinity College, Oxford (winning the Gaisford Prize in 1900).

He joined the staff of the British Museum Library in 1904; he was appointed Deputy Keeper of the Department of Printed Books in 1930 and remained in that office until retirement in 1945.

His major achievements included producing (sometimes with others) parts 2 to 8 of the Catalogue of Books Printed in the XVth Century Now in the British Museum (published from 1912 to 1949; he edited parts 5 to 8), and authoring the short-title catalogues of the library's 16th-century Italian and German books (1958 and 1962).

He was the Sandars Reader in Bibliography at the University of Cambridge in 1930 and presented the Italian Lecture at the British Academy in 1948. That year, he was elected a fellow of the latter; he also received two honorary doctorates and the Bibliographical Society's gold medal, was appointed a CBE in 1961, and was the dedicatee of a Festschrift in 1970.
