= Otto Scholderer =

German painter

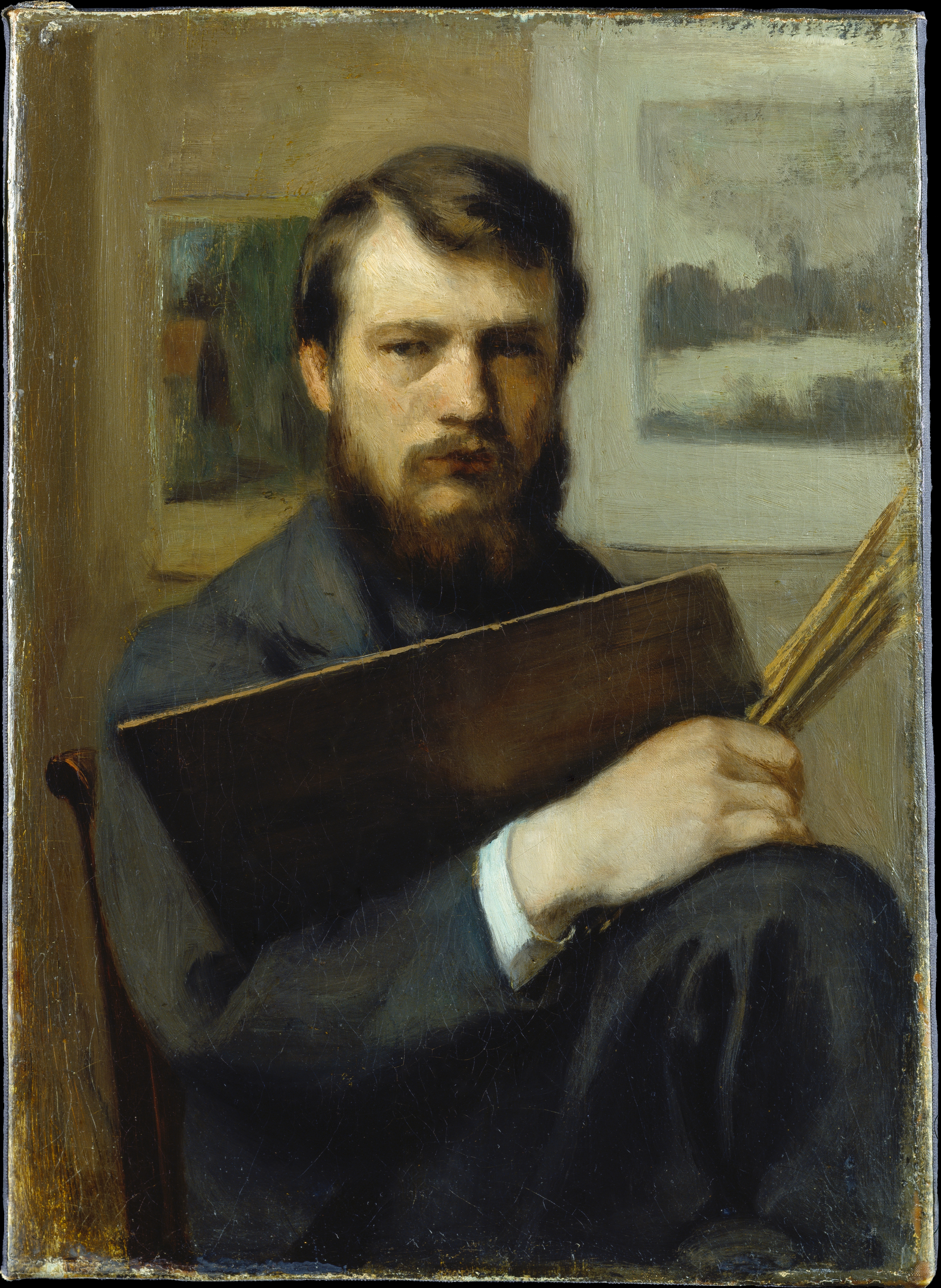
Otto Scholderer: Self-portrait with Palette

Otto Franz Scholderer (25 January 1834 – 22 January 1902) was a German painter.

== Life ==
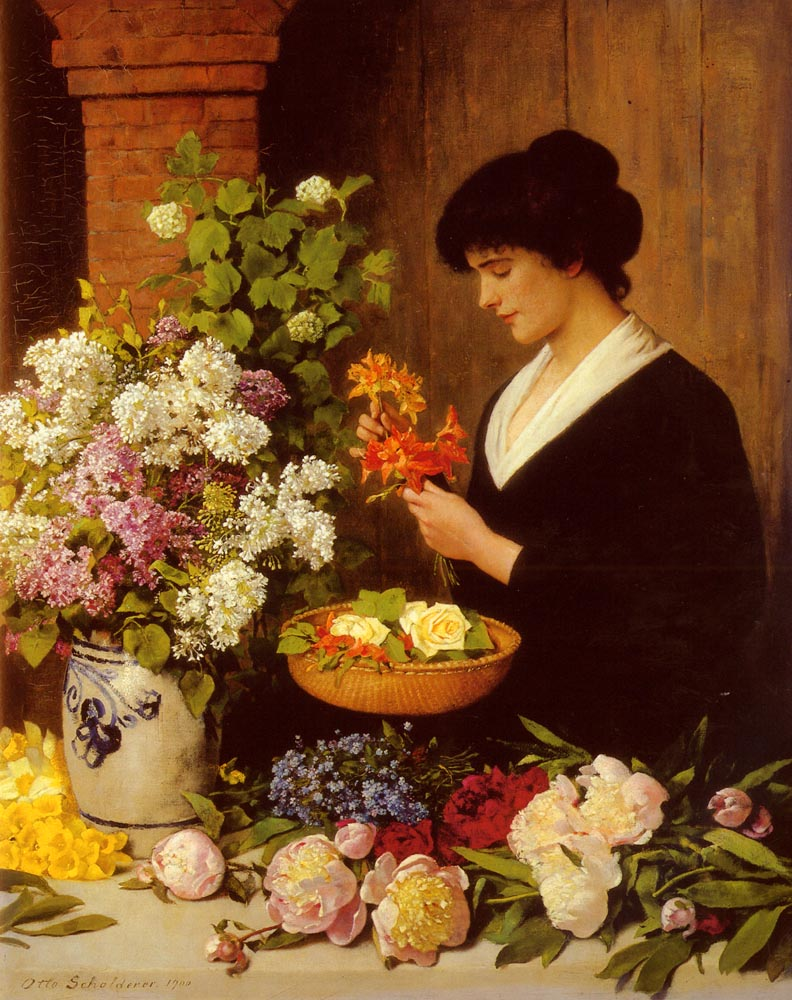
The Flower Arrangement

He was born in Frankfurt am Main. On completing his schooling, Scholderer went to the Städel academy of arts in 1849, where he remained until 1851. Among his teachers were the art historian Johann David Passavant and the painter Jakob Becker. Subsequently, Scholderer established himself in Städel as a freelance painter. During this period his friendship with Victor Müller began; Scholderer became his brother-in-law in 1868, when Müller married his sister, Ida Scholderer.

Through Müller, Scholderer became acquainted with the works of Gustave Courbet. Scholderer made several short study trips to Paris between 1857 and 1858, where he became friends with Henri Fantin-Latour and Édouard Manet, whose influence can be seen in his subsequent work. Fantin-Latour depicted Scholderer in his picture Studio aux Batignolles . Starting from 1858, Scholderer worked and lived predominantly in Kronberg in Taunus, where his colleagues included Anton Burger, Peter Burnitz and Louis Eysen; he was close to the Kronberger painter colony.

In 1866, Scholderer established himself in Düsseldorf and made friends with Hans Thoma. With Thoma, Scholderer went in 1868 to Paris and returned to Germany only shortly before the outbreak of the French-German War. First Scholderer established himself in Munich, renewing his friendship with Wilhelm Leibl and becoming one of the artists of the Leibl-Kreis (Leibl circle). At the beginning of 1871 he went to London and worked there till the autumn of 1899, he married his wife Luise there in 1871. After 1899, Scholderer returned to his hometown of Frankfurt, where he died at the age of almost 68 years on 22 January 1902.

The couple's only child, born in Putney was the noted bibliographer (Julius) Victor Scholderer (1880–1971).

Otto Scholderer's art, initially dominated by landscapes, later consisted primarily of portraits and still lifes. The important connection between the romantic period and the Impressionists is evident in his work.

== Works (selection) ==
- The violinist at the window (1861)
- Preparing for a Fancy Ball (1879-1880) – Musée d'Orsay, Paris
- Mrs. Scholderer at the Frühstückstisch
- Portrait of Oswald Sickert

== Gallery ==
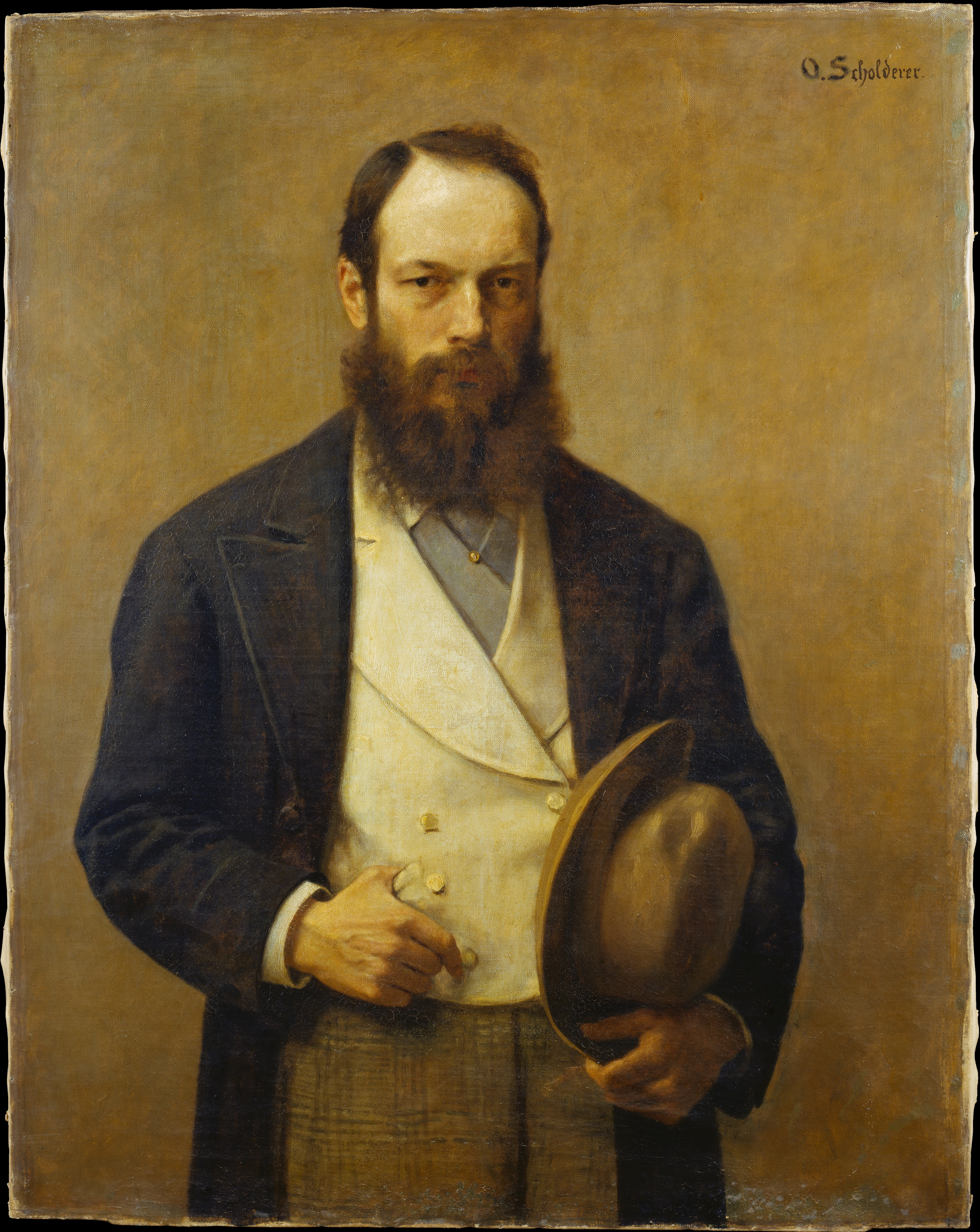
Self-portrait 1875-76

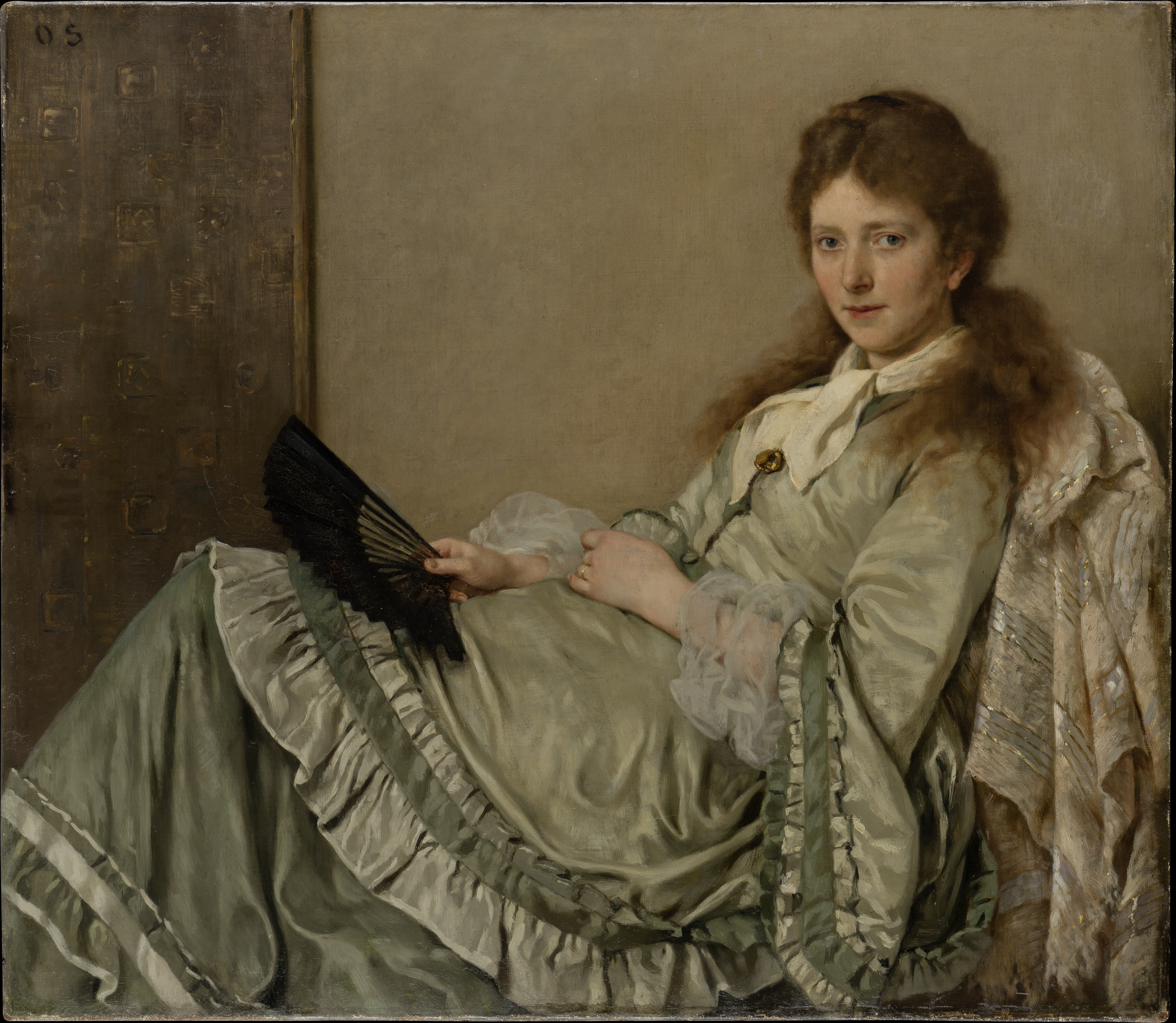
A portrait of his wife Luise Scholderer on the Ottoman

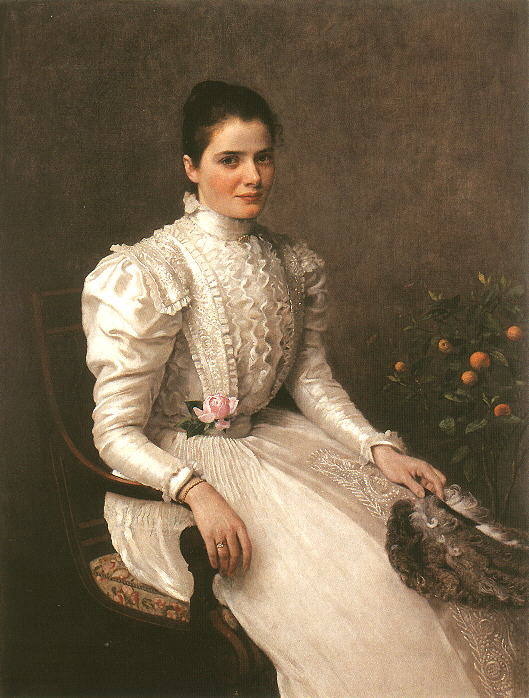
A portrait of his niece Lucy Scholderer

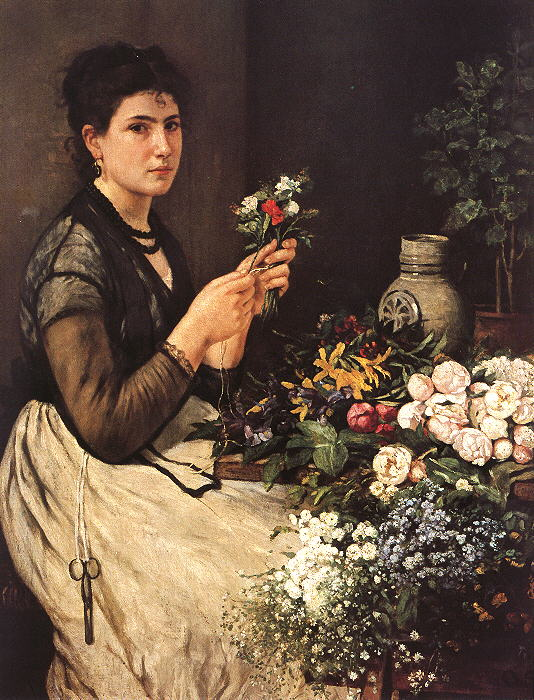
Flower arranger

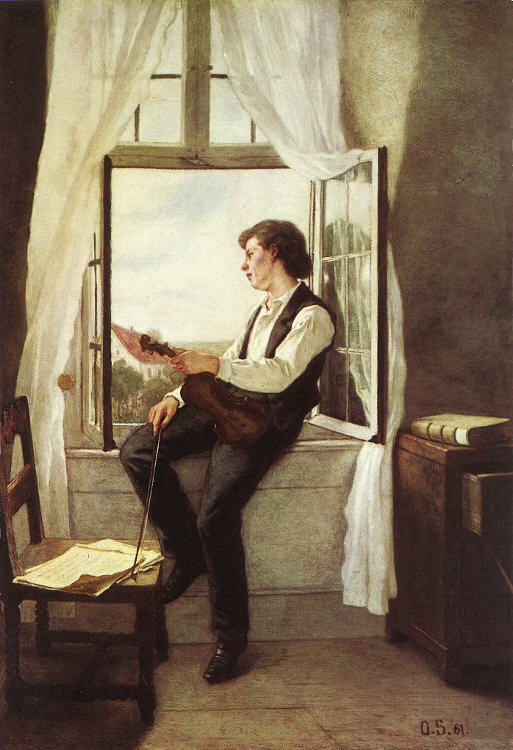
The violinist at the window

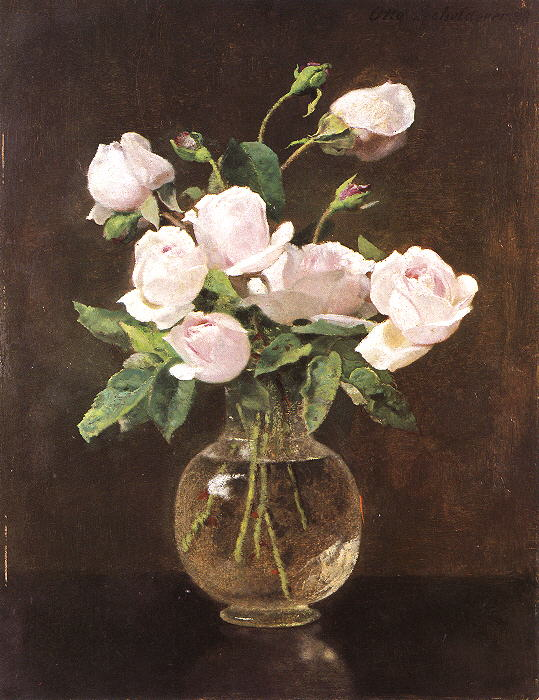
Roses in glass vase

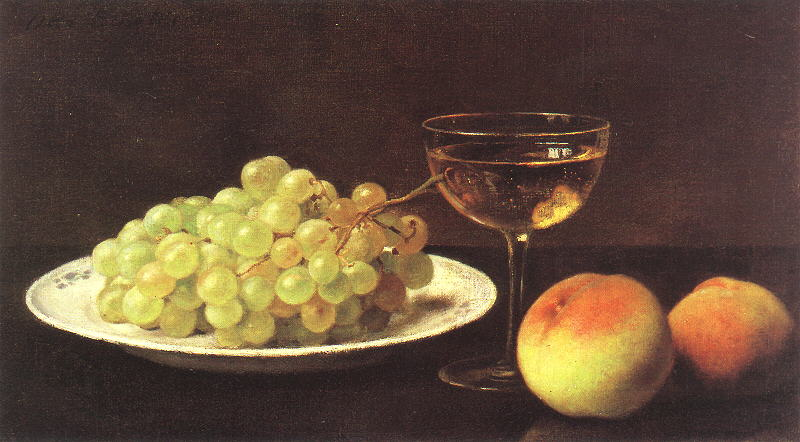
Still life with grapes, two peaches, glass of sherry

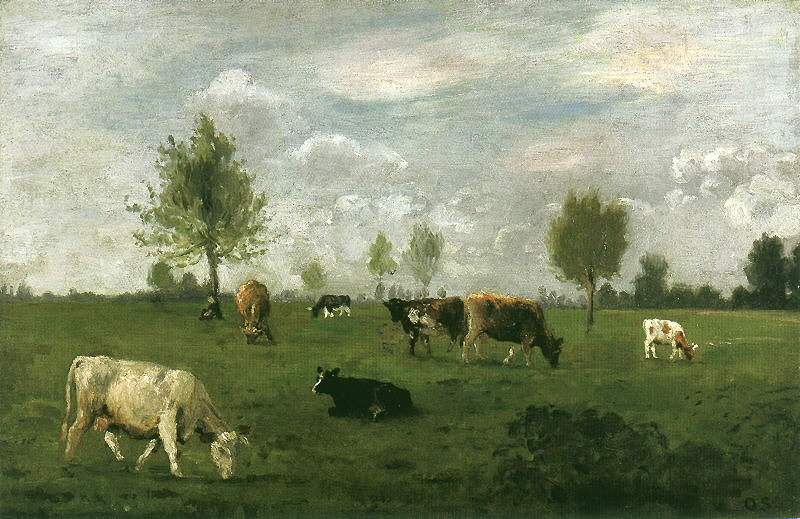
Pasture near Zons on Rhine

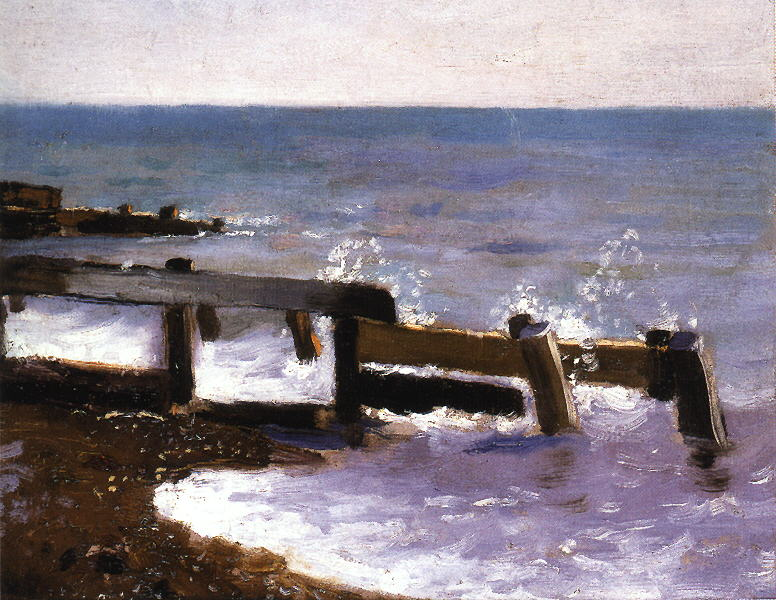
Sea surf

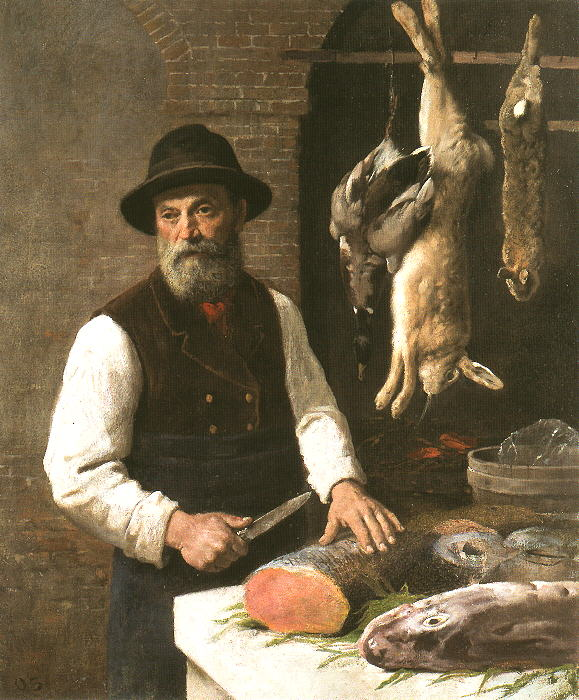
Wild game dealer

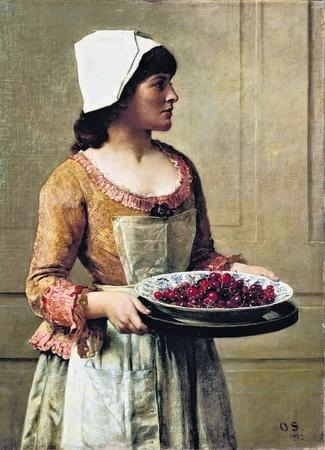
Serving girl with berries

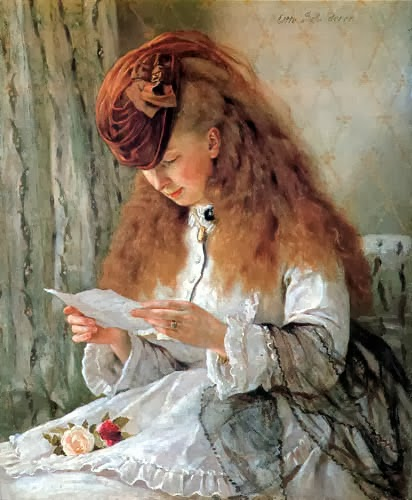
Girl reading a letter

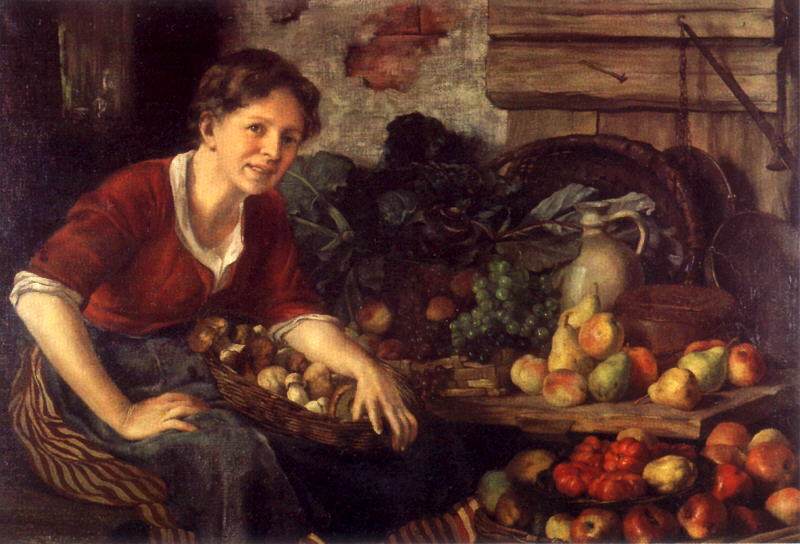
Still life with young woman

== Literature ==
- Jutta M. Bagdahn: Otto Franz Scholderer: 1834 - 1902; Monographie and list of works . Freiburg 2002.Online resource
- Friedrich autumn: Otto Scholderer 1834-1902. A contribution for the history of art and artist 19th Century , Diesterweg, Frankfurt/M. 1934
- Dieter vine table (Hrsg.): Art and artist in Frankfurt/M. in 19th and 20th Century , Kramer, Frankfurt/M. 2003, ISBN 3-7829-0545-8 * Heinrich Weizsäcker (Hrsg.): Art and artist in Frankfurt/Main in 19th Century , bear, Frankfurt/M.
  - 1. - Frankfurt art lives in 19th Century in its fundamental courses , 1907
  - 2. - Biographic encyclopedia the Frankfurt artists in 19th Century , 1908
- Jutta M. Bagdahn: ″OTTO FRANZ SCHOLDERER 1834–1902. Monographie und Werkverzeichnis″, Wissenschaftlicher Verlag Berlin, Berlin 2020

== See also ==
- A Studio at Les Batignolles
