= Wilhelm Leibl =

German painter (1844–1900)

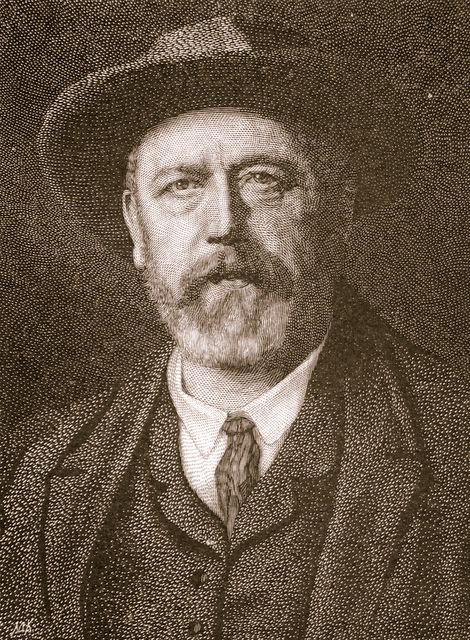
- Wilhelm Leibl
- Born: Wilhelm Maria Hubertus Leibl; October 23, 1844; Cologne, Kingdom of Prussia
- Died: December 4, 1900 (aged 56); Würzburg, Kingdom of Bavaria, German Empire
- Occupation: Painter

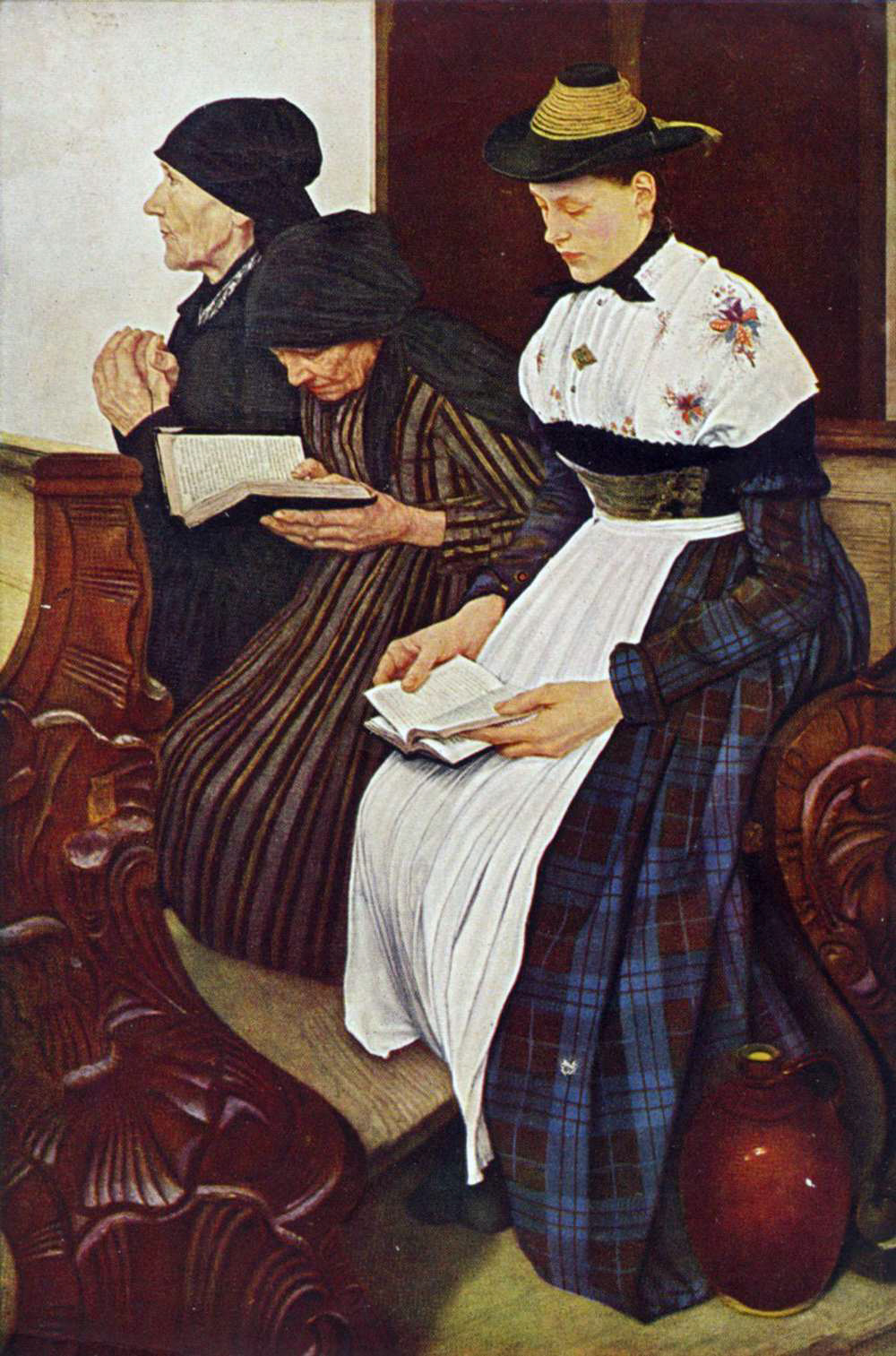
Three Women in Church (1881)

Wilhelm Maria Hubertus Leibl (October 23, 1844 – December 4, 1900) was a German realist painter. He became famous for his portraits and depictions of scenes of peasant life.

== Biography ==
Leibl was born in Cologne, where his father was the director of the Cathedral choir. He was apprenticed to a locksmith before beginning his artistic training with the local painter Hermann Becker in 1861. He entered the Munich Academy in 1864, subsequently studying with several artists including Karl von Piloty. He set up a group studio in 1869, with Johann Sperl, Theodor Alt, and Rudolf Hirth du Frênes. At about the same time, Gustave Courbet visited Munich to exhibit his work, making a considerable impression on many of the local artists by his demonstrations of alla prima painting directly from nature. Leibl's paintings, which already reflected his admiration for the Dutch old masters, became looser in style, their subjects rendered with thickly brushed paint against dark backgrounds.

== Career ==
In 1869, following Courbet's suggestion, Leibl went to Paris, where he was introduced to Édouard Manet, but was forced to return to Germany in 1870, due to the outbreak of the Franco-Prussian War. In 1873 Leibl left Munich for the isolated Bavarian countryside, where he depicted the local peasants in everyday scenes devoid of sentimentality or anecdote. The sketchlike quality of his earlier paintings was replaced by greater precision and attention to drawing. Living from 1878 to 1882 in Berbling, he painted perhaps his best-known work, the Three Women in Church (Kunsthalle, Hamburg). Its intensely realistic style recalls Hans Holbein in its clarity of definition. During the following years he moved to the town of Bad Aibling and, in 1892, to Kutterling, as his paintings united the disciplined drawing he had adopted in the 1880s with a new delicacy and luminosity.

Leibl painted without preliminary drawing, setting to work directly with color, an approach that has parallels to Impressionism. His commitment to the representation of reality as the eye sees it earned him recognition in his lifetime as the preeminent artist of a group known as the Leibl-Kreis (Leibl Circle) that included, among others, Carl Schuch, Wilhelm Trübner, Otto Scholderer, and Hans Thoma.

During the first half of the 1870s, Leibl executed a series of 19 etchings in a meticulous style. His charcoal drawings are conceived in great masses of light and shadow, blocked in as though he were using a brush and paint.

He visited the Netherlands in 1898, and his work was included in the Berlin Secession exhibition the following year. He died in Würzburg in 1900.

Selected works

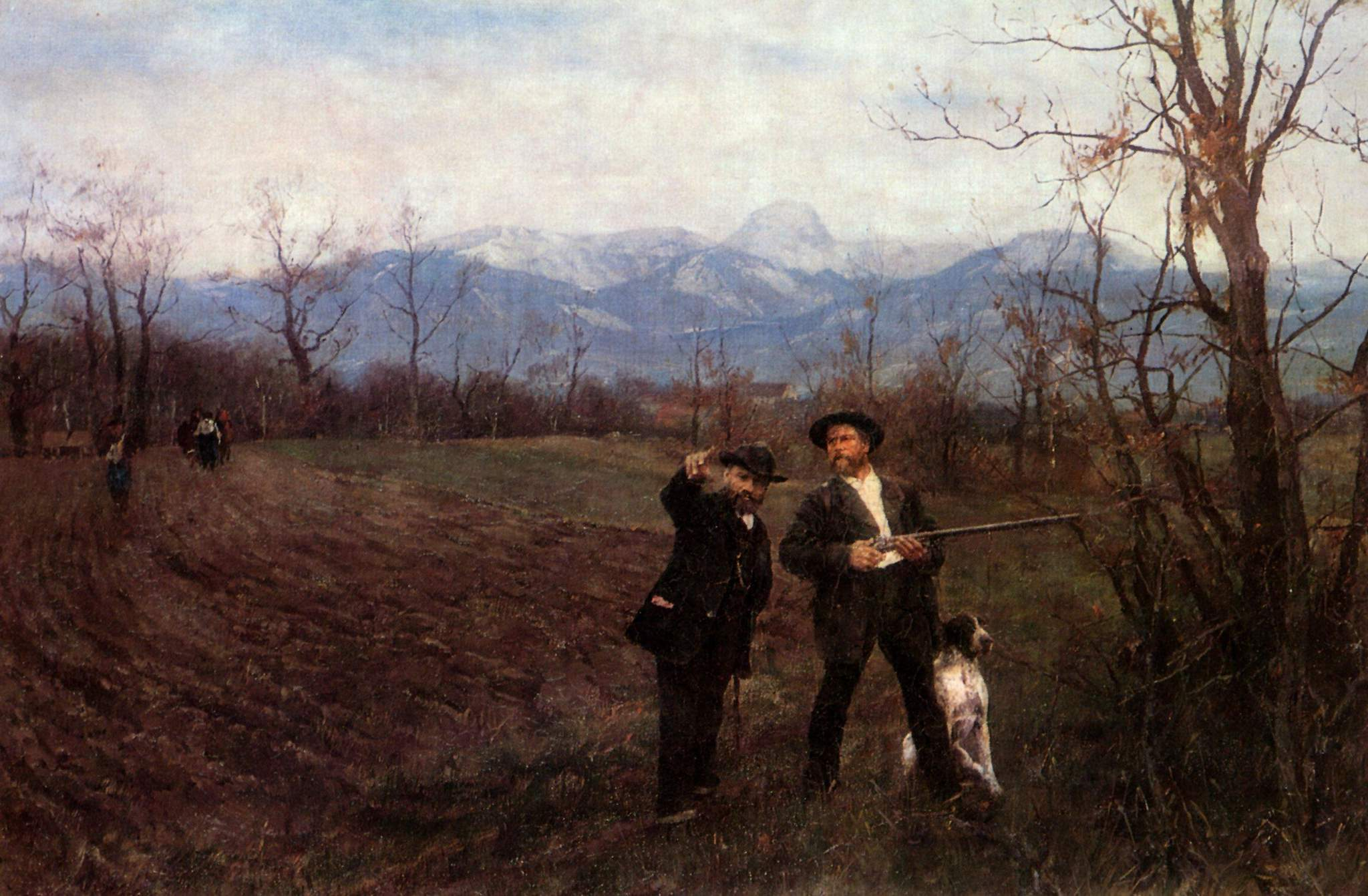
Wilhelm Leibl and Sperl on the hunt, 1890–1895, oil on canvas, Neue Pinakothek

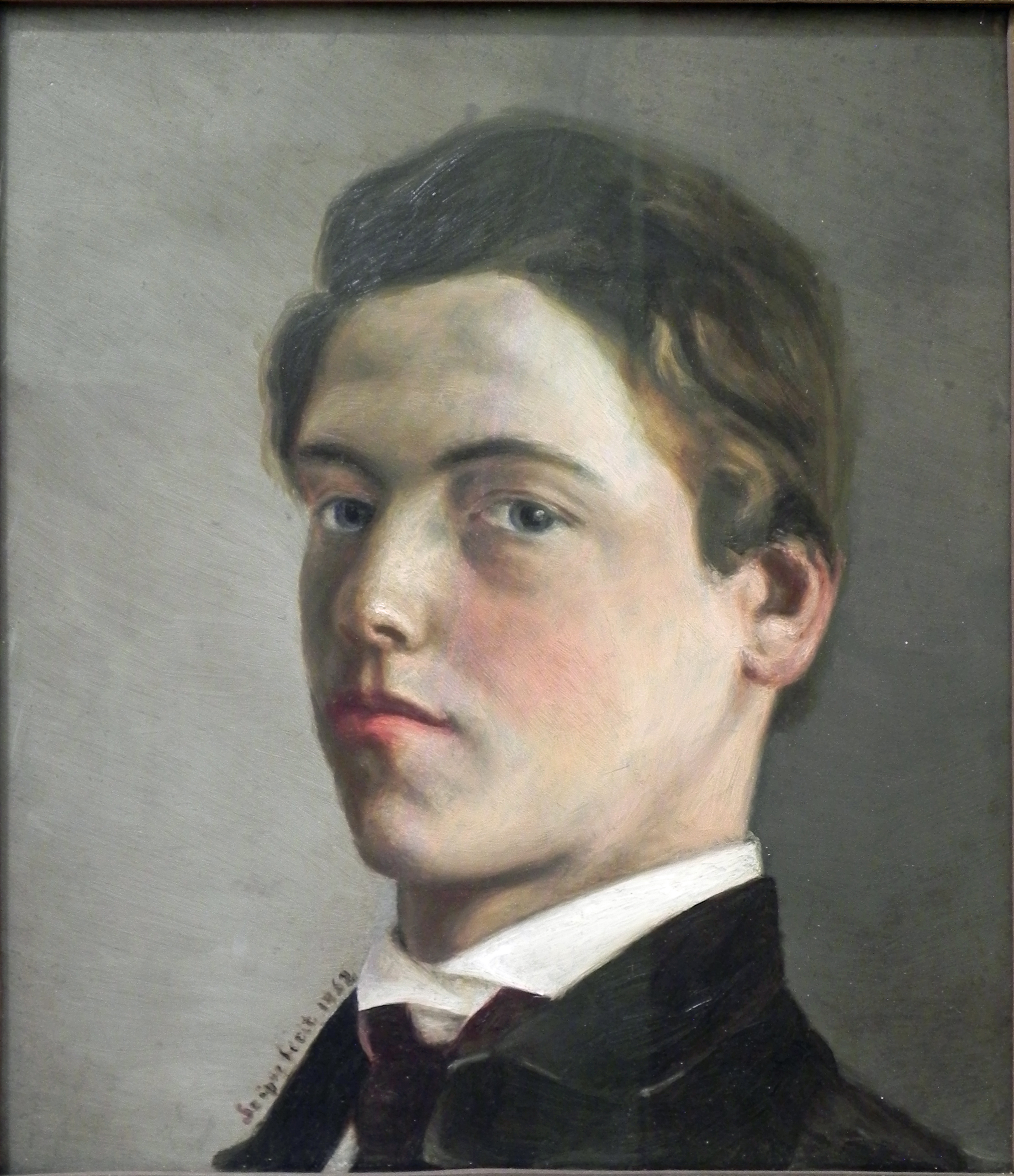
Self-Portrait at the Age of Eighteen (1862)

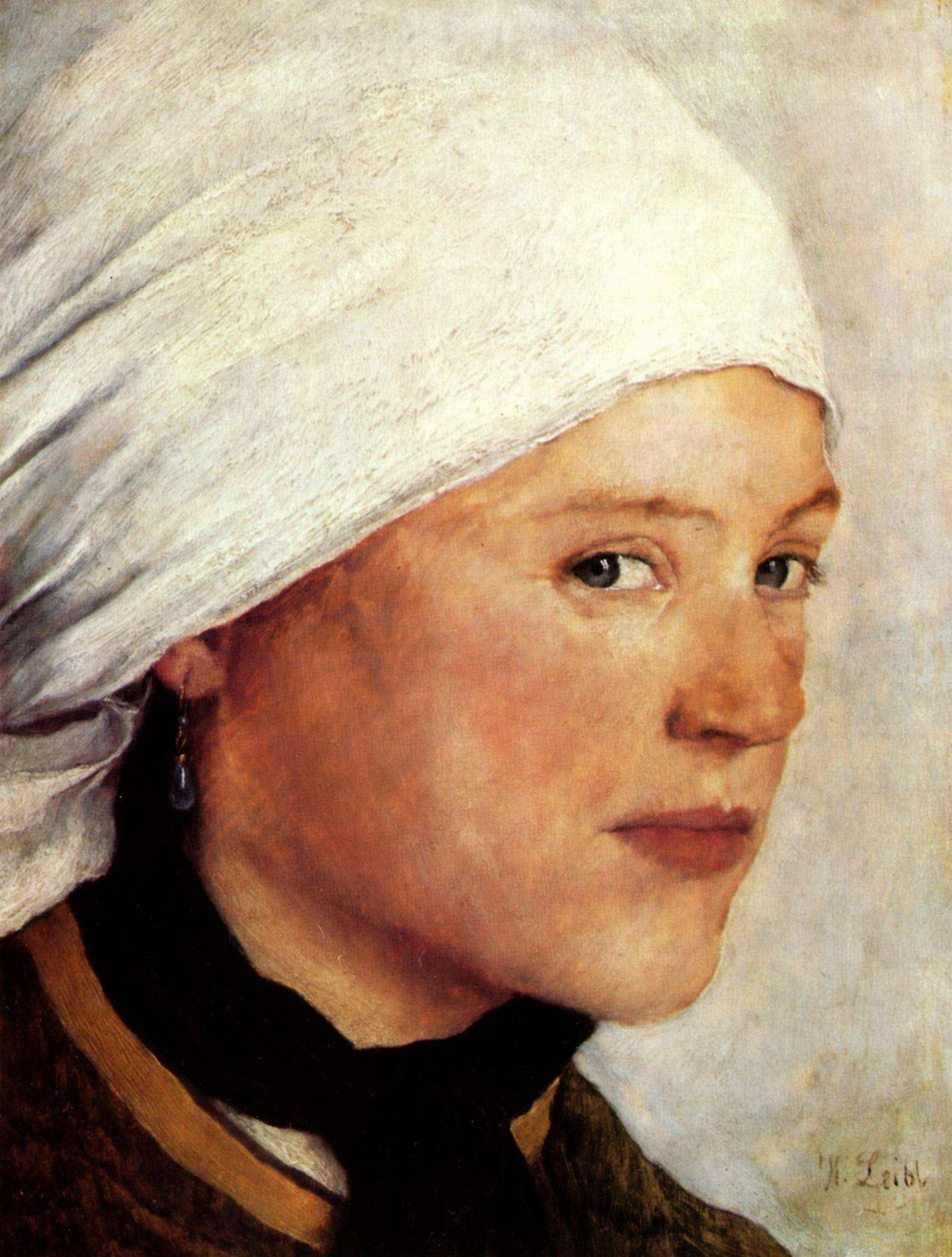
Girl with White Headscarf, c. 1876, oil on panel

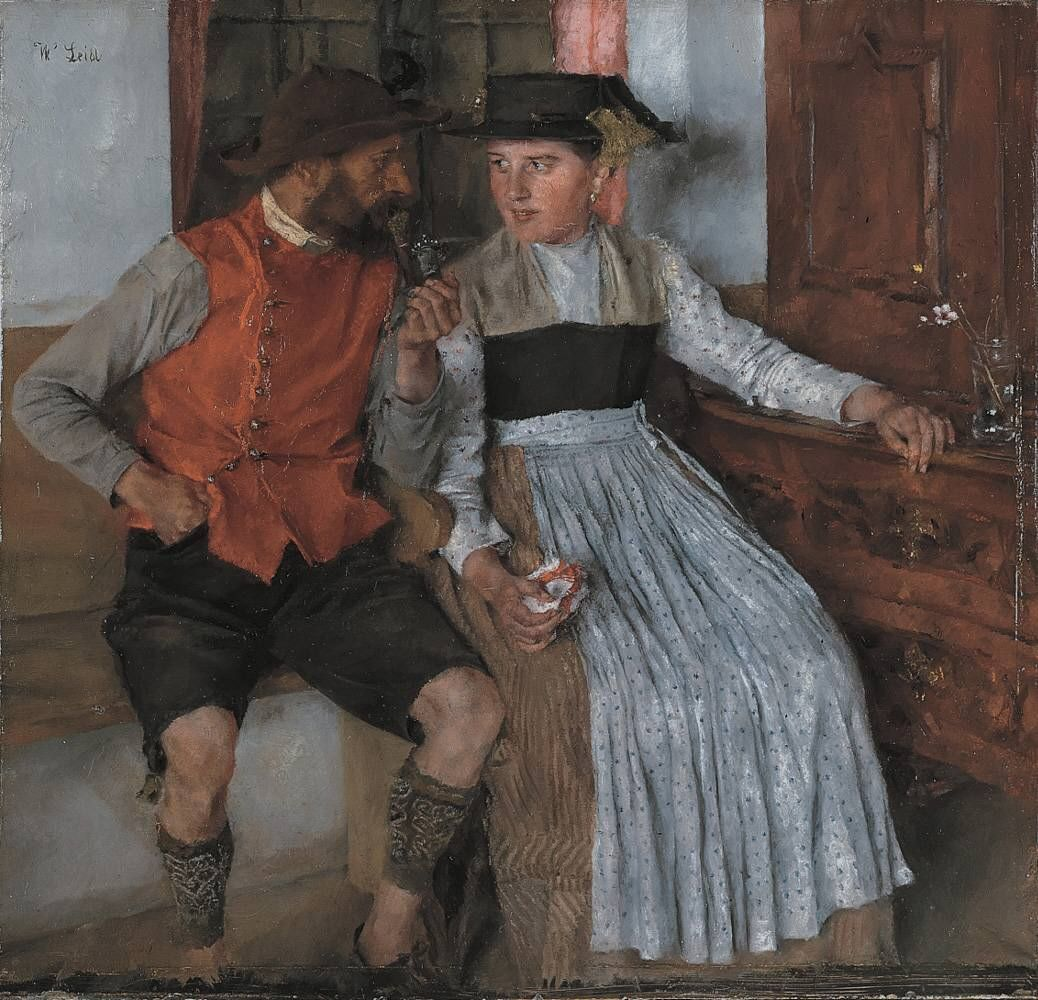
In der Bauernstube, 1890, oil on panel

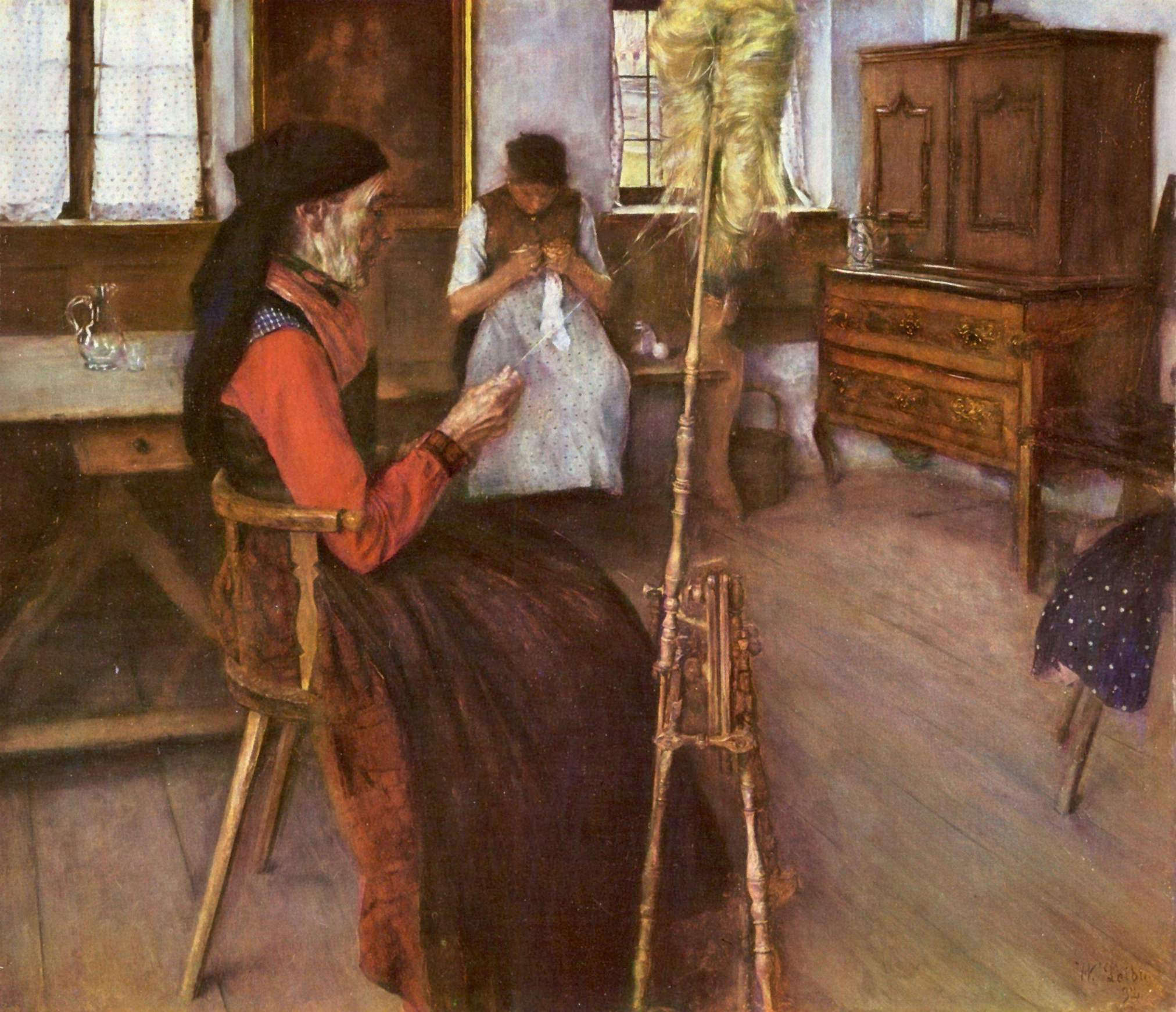
Die Spinnerin, 1892

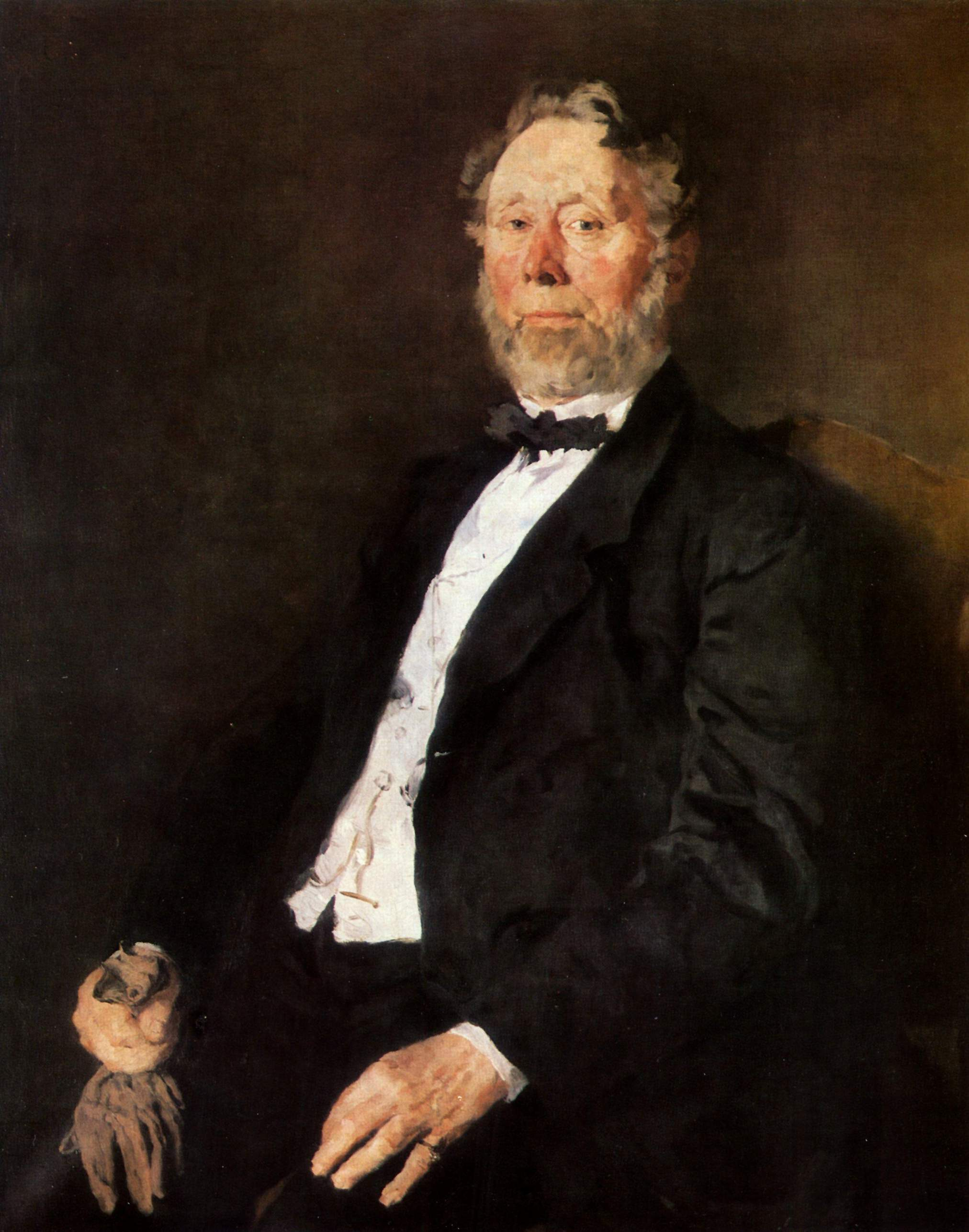
Johann Heinrich Pallenberg, 1871

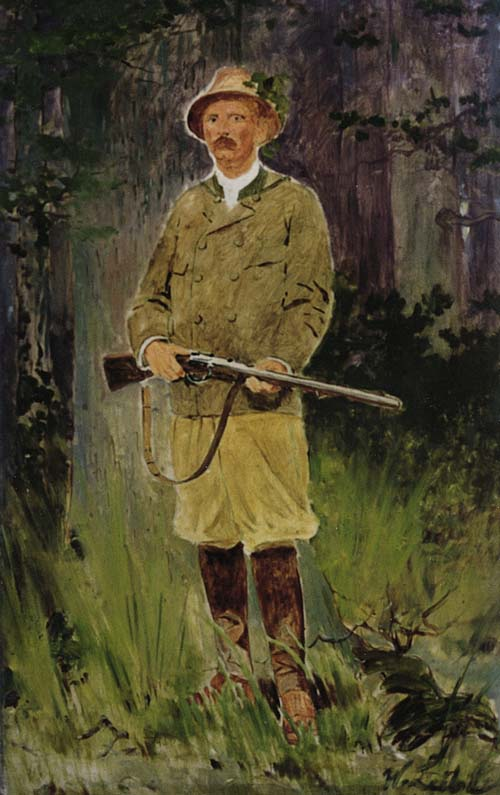
Freiherr von Perfall als Jäger

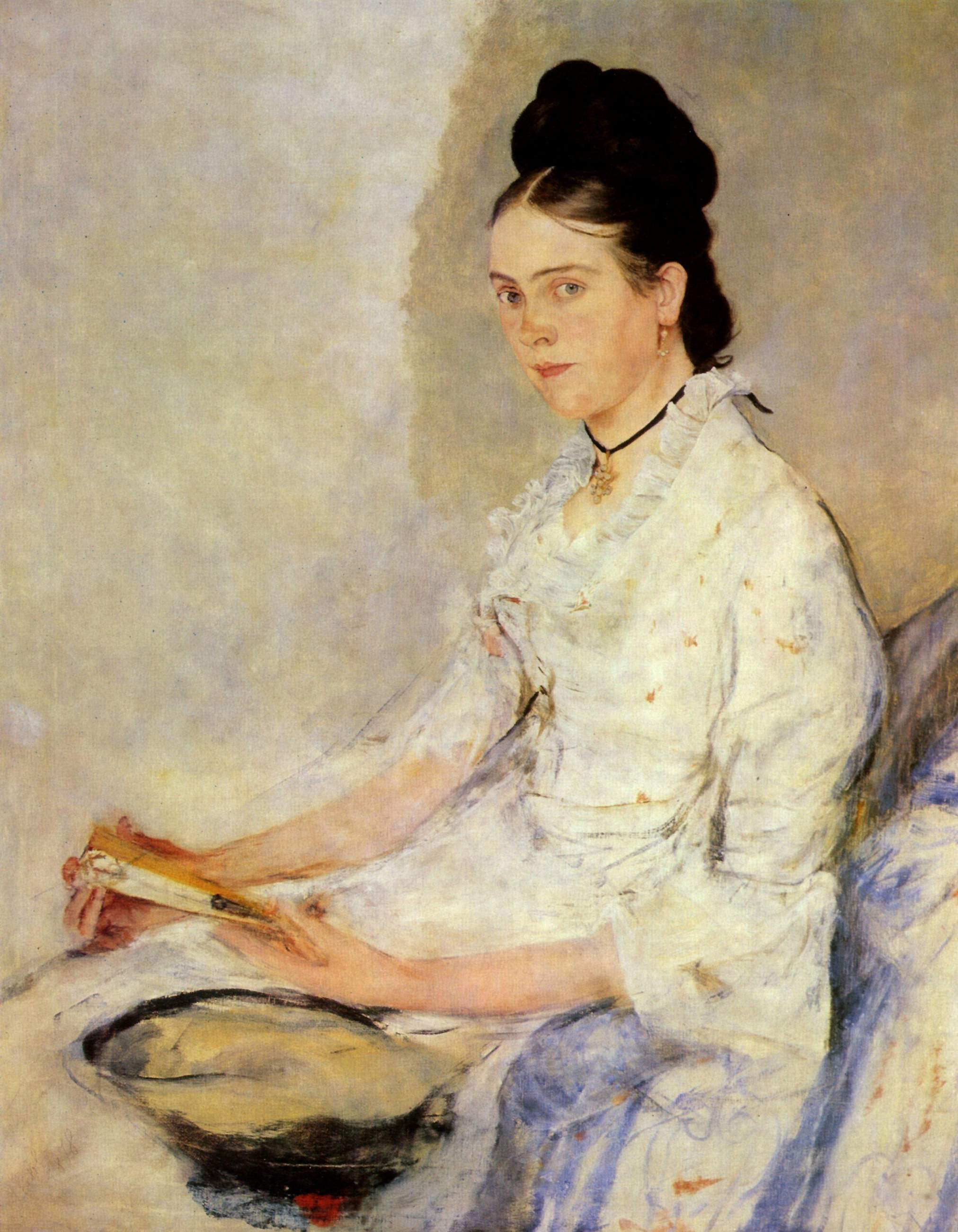
Portrait of Rosine Fischler, Gräfin Treuberg, 1878

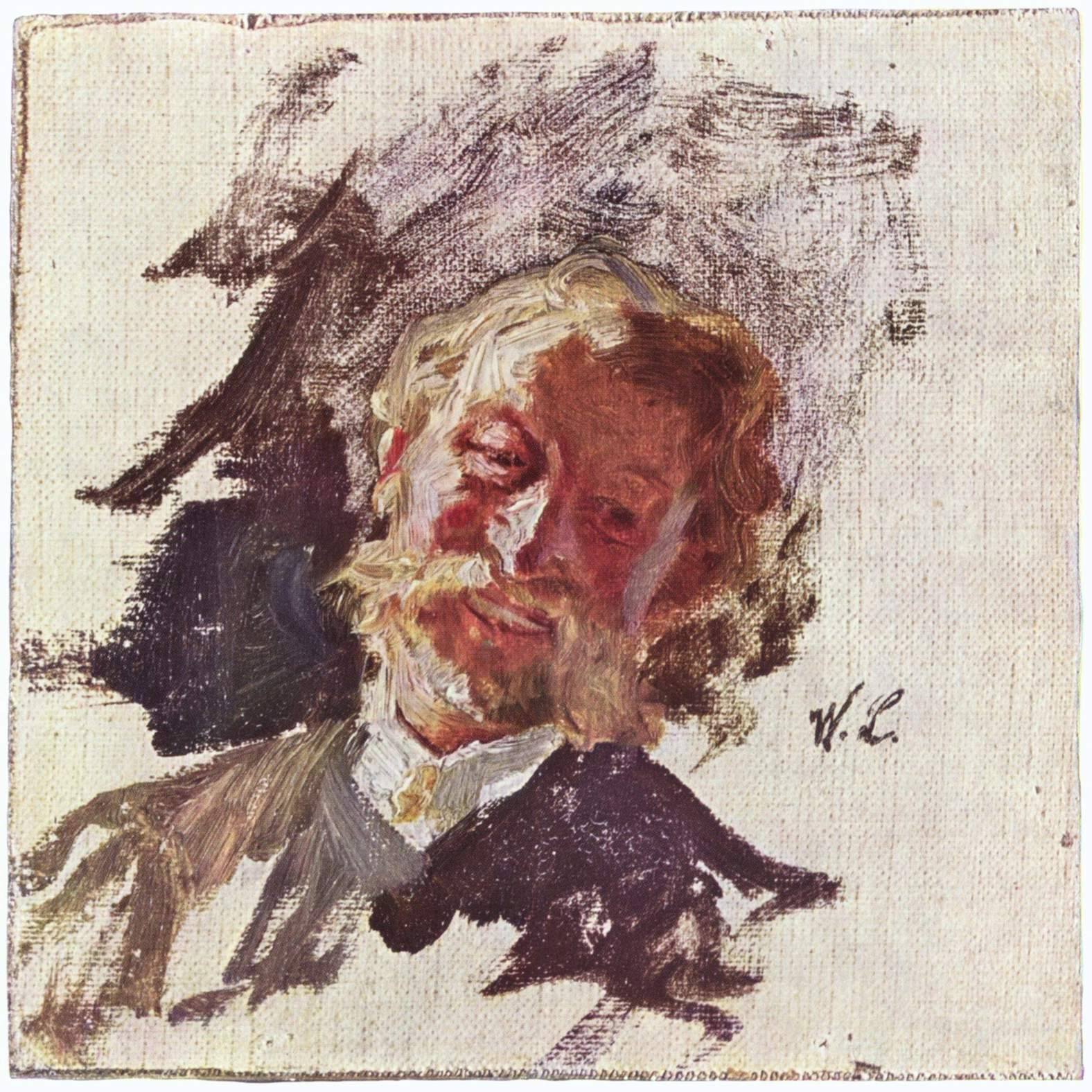
Portrait of a Man, c. 1890

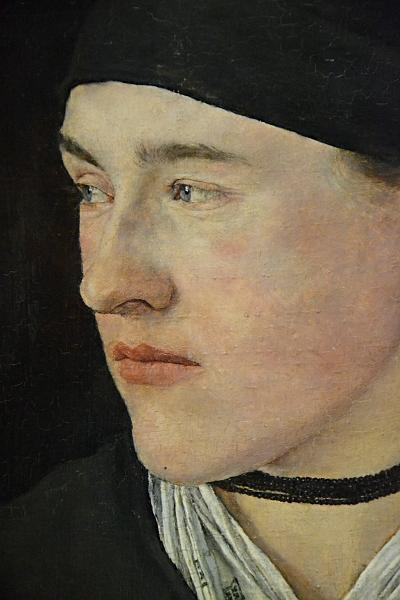
Girl with Black Headscarf, 1879, oil on panel (detail)

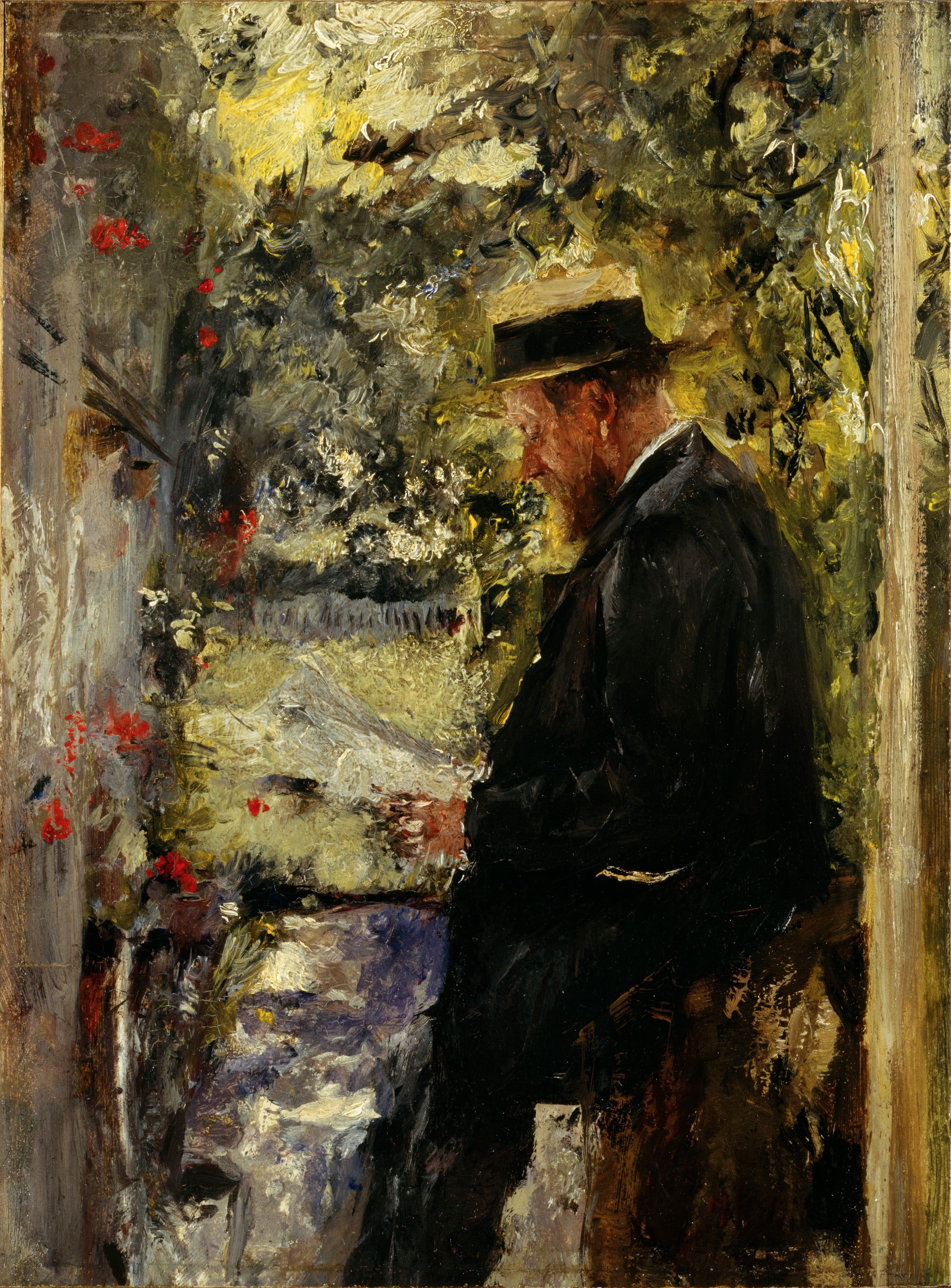
Veterinarian Dr. Reindl in the arbor, c. 1890

== Nazi-looted art ==
In 2009 the German Advisory Commission for the Return of Cultural Property Seized as a Result of Nazi Persecution recommended that Leibl's painting Bauernmädchen ohne Hut mit weißem Halstuch (‘Peasant Girl without a Hat and with a White Headcloth’) (1897), which had been seized by the Nazis, be restituted to the heirs of Dr. Alexander Lewin.
