= Emil Hartmann =

Danish composer (1836–1898)

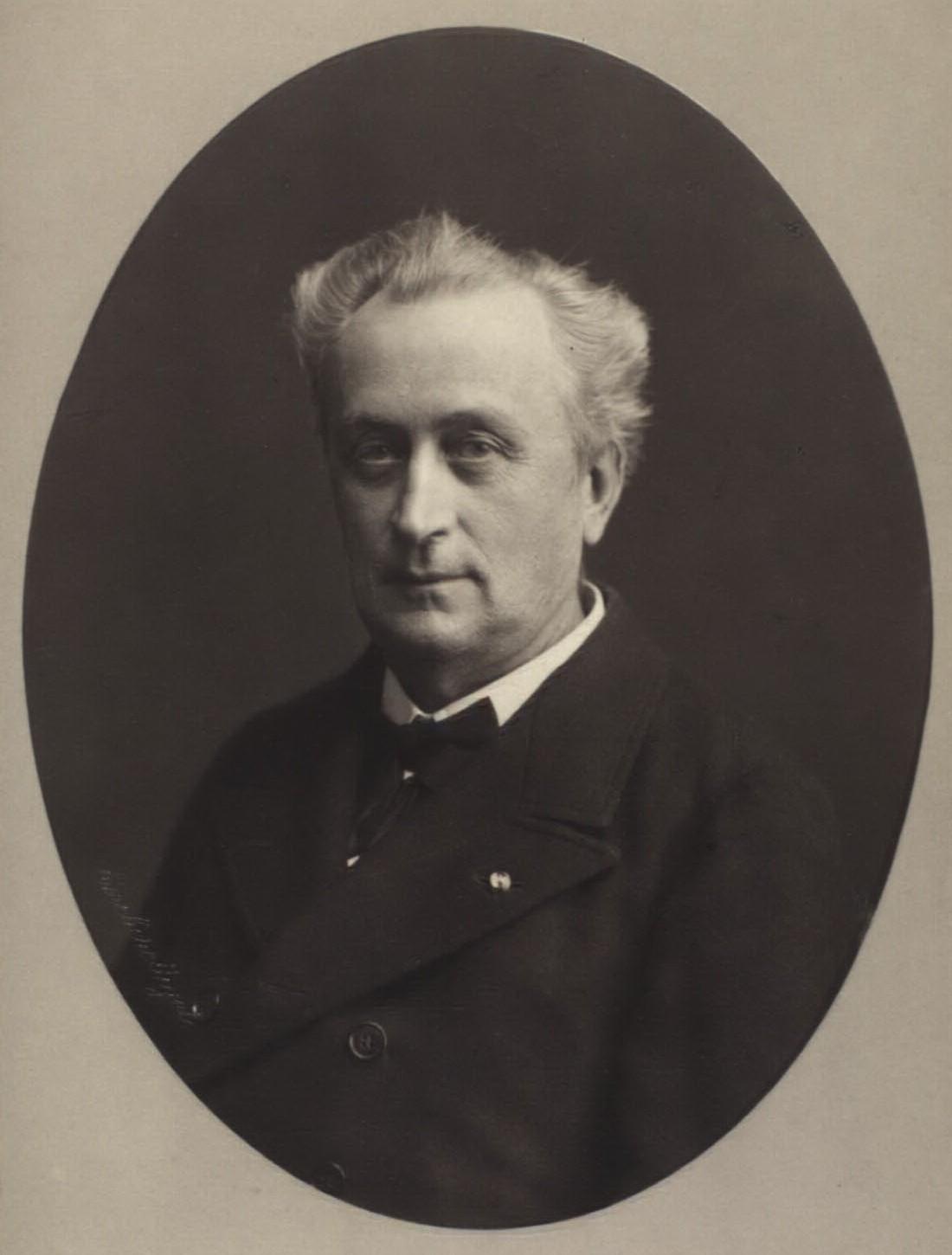
Emil Hartmann.

Emil Hartmann (21 February 1836–18 July 1898) was a Danish composer of the romantic period, fourth generation of composers in the Danish Hartmann musical family. His music is distinctly Nordic and tuneful and won great popularity in his time.

== Early life and education ==
Hartmann was born on 21 February 1836 in Copenhagen, the eldest son of composer Johan Peter Emilius Hartmann and of his composer wife Emma Hartmann. He grew up in the Zinn House in Copenhagen.

Emil Hartmann got his first education from his father Johan Peter Emilius and brother-in-law Niels Gade. His piano teachers were Niels Ravnkilde (1823–1890) and Anton Rée (1820–1886). Letters from Hans Christian Andersen show that he was composing even before he could talk properly.

== Career ==
Emil Hartmann was a composer of the Danish Golden Age. He wrote seven symphonies, concertos for respectively violin, cello and piano, several ouvertures, a symphonic poem (Hakon Jarl), orchestral suites, serenades, ballets, operas and singspiels, incidental music and cantatas. He was also the author of multiple works of chamber music (nonet, piano quintet, string quartets, clarinet quartets, piano trios, serenade for clarinet, cello and piano, sonatas for violin and piano, etc.), songs and piano music. His opera Ragnhild («Runenzauber» in German) was created by Gustav Mahler in Hamburg. His music is resolutely Nordic, colourful and melodic and won great popularity in his days when performed. At the time, his Nordic folk dances (from 1859 to 1860) as well as his later arrangements of Scandinavian folk music became famous, in line with Brahms’ Hungarian Dances or Dvorak's Slavonic Dances. Stylistically, his works can probably best be described as a sort of distant Scandinavian pendant to the music of some of his more famous contemporaries such as Dvorak or Tchaikovsky. Most of his works were published by German editors.

In 1858, Hartmann' s first major work to be played in public was a Passion Hymn on a text by Bernhard Severin Ingemann for Soprano, Chorus and Orchestra, played on Easter Day in Copenhagen Cathedral. That same year, he and his later brother-in-law August Winding were given the task to compose music for August Bournonville's ballet Fjeldstuen. The ballet was first performed at the Royal Theater in Copenhagen in May 1859 and became an immediate success which ran for a long time.

Still in 1859, he received a scholarship and went on study tour to Germany, where he spent most time in Leipzig, but visited also Berlin, Paris and Vienna. After returning to Denmark, he took a position as organist at the St. Johannes Church in Copenhagen in 1861 and from 1871 at the Christiansborg Palace Chapel.

Emil Hartmann was a gifted conductor and went yearly to Germany and elsewhere to conduct his works in the major cities, always to great acclaim. Following the decease of Niels W. Gade, he became his successor at the head of the Copenhagen Musikforeningen for a brief period but had to resign for health reasons.

== Family ==
Emil Hartmann belonged to an old family of artists which dominated Danish musical life for close to a century and a half. Both his father, mother, grandfather and great-grandfather were renowned musicians and composers, as well as his brothers-in-law Niels Gade and August Winding. He was also brother to the sculptor Carl Hartmann. His close relationship with the leading composers of the day in Denmark - his father and Gade - however cast overwhelming shadows over his own works, forcing him to seek recognition abroad, in particular in Germany.

In 1864, Emil Hartmann married Bolette Puggaard, a daughter of the wealthy merchant and philanthropist Rudolph Puggaard and granddaughter of merchant Hans Puggaard and his painter wife Bolette Puggaard. For his wedding in the Cathedral Vor Frue Kirke in Copenhagen, Niels W. Gade and Hans Christian Andersen wrote in common a wedding cantata. He acquired the house Carlsminde on the countryside North of Copenhagen where he could compose quietly.

Emil Hartmann had three sons, Johannes Palmer Hartmann (1870–1948) who established a large horticulture in Ghent, Rudolph Puggaard Hartmann (1871–1958), an electro-engineer, and Oluf Hartmann (1879–1910), a painter, who died early and in whose memory Carl Nielsen wrote his Andante Lamentoso, "At the bier of a young artist". His two daughters were Bodil Neergaard (1867–1959), a soprano, philanthropist and patron of the arts who lived at Fuglsang Manor in Lolland, and Agnete Lehmann (1868–1902), actress at the Royal Theatre in Copenhagen, and wife of Julius Lehmann (1861–1931), theatre and opera instructor. The Danish film director Lars von Trier descends from Emil Hartmann.

== Personality ==
Despite his sparkling talent, Emil Hartmann was undoubtedly one of the tragic figures in the history of music suffering all his life from poor health necessitating long stays in psychiatric hospitals. This may explain his personality which reflected both his great charm, his fiery temper and a darker and melancholic side. Still, when his health allowed he could display a baroque sense of humour. Anecdotes about his eccentricities abound. One day for instance, when he was staying at Fuglsang manor, a German lady had been expected but her arrival had been delayed. So he decided instead to dress himself up with grey curls and a black dress, pretending to be her, and played his role so well that none of the other guests doubted a minute that he was really this lady. One of them whispered to her neighbour that this was really a «rather vulgar person». The children had difficulties to remain serious. However, at one point, he made a dramatic gesture pointing at a painting on the wall of the naked Kraka, trying in vain to hide her charms by means of a fishing net, and said loudly in German: «Ah, maybe the late baroness?», whereupon everybody burst into laughter and the disguise could no longer be hidden.

Emil Hartmann was a cosmopolitan and used to say: «Yes of course, God, King and Country, and the World Axe goes through the horse in Kongens Nytorv« (statue in Copenhagen's central square). His son Rudolph describes also his hostility to the rampant anti-semitism of the day, one of his favourite sayings being that «we are all Jews for our Lord».

After 1870, he suffered increasingly from poor health, psychological troubles and regular depressions, and decided on several occasions to reside for long periods in psychiatric institutions for treatment. His later years were marked by a growing weakness that often put him in dark moods; he tried then to abreact by taking a walk with a whip and crack it at imaginary critics of his art.

After his death, his music fell in oblivion, but its verve and charm and masterful instrumentation have caught lately attention again.

== List of works ==
Here is an incomplete list of his works:

- First Piano Sonata, in F major
- Second Piano Sonata, in D major
- Scherzetto for piano, dedicated to Niels Wilhelm Gade
- Two Capriccios for Piano
- Jery und Baetely (Singspiel after Goethe)
- First String Quartet, in A major
- First Piano Trio, in F♯ minor
- First Quartet, in A major, for Clarinet, Violin, Viola and Cello
- Second Quartet, in B major, for Clarinet, Violin, Viola and Cello
- First Sonata for Violin and Piano, in G major
- Op. 1 Four Songs for Voice and Piano, on texts by Emil Aarestrup and Christian Winther (1857)
- Passion Hymn (Soprano, Chorus and Orchestra, on a text by Bernhard Severin Ingemann 1858)
- Fjeldstuen (Ballet composed together with his brother-in-law August Winding, on a choreography by August Bournonville, 1859)
- Op. 2 Halling og Menuet (Wedding music - published as Nordic folk dance no. 4)
- Ten Spiritual Songs (1860)
- Op. 3 A Night in the Mountains (En Nat mellem Fjeldene, Singspiel after Jens Christian Hostrup, 1863)
- Op. 3a Spring Dance (Published as Nordic folk dance No. 5)
- Cantata for the Inauguration of the Johanneskirke in Copenhagen (Chorus and Organ, 1861)
- Wedding songs (Chorus and Orchestra, 1864, for his own wedding)
- Op. 4 Elver Girl (Elverpigen, Opera after Thomas Overskou, 1867)
- Op. 5 Twenty Four Romances and melodies for song and piano (dedicated to Bolette Hartmann, 1864, wherein nine love songs after Christian Winther, published in Germany as Lieder und Weisen im nordischem Volkston, for Voice and Piano)
- Op. 5a Piano Quintet, in G minor (1865)
- Op. 6 First Symphony, in D minor
- Op. 6a Old Memories (Gamle Minder, Second movement of the first symphony, later published as Nordic folk dance No. 2)
- Op. 6b Elver girls and hunters (Elverpigerne og jægerne, Third movement of the first symphony, later published as Nordic folk dance No. 3)
- Op. 7 Suite (Orchestra)
- Op. 8 Little Mermaid (Havfruen - Solo, Chorus and Orchestra - 1867)
- Op. 9 Second Symphony, in E minor
- Op. 10 Second Piano Trio, in B major (1867, dedicated to J.P.E. Hartmann)
- Op. 10a Second String Quartet, in A major
- Op. 11 Fra Hoejlandene, Nordiske Tonebilleder, for piano (Five Pieces entitled respectively: Fra Højlandene, Gamle minder, En leg, Fra fjorden, Folkedans -1869)
- Cantata for Rudolf and Signe Puggaard's Silver Wedding (Chorus and Piano, 1868)
- Op. 12 Second Sonata for Violin and Piano, in A minor (1868)
- Op. 12a Andante and Allegro for Violin and Piano (first movement of the Sonata Opus 12, dedicated to N.W. Gade)
- Third Symphony, in B♭ major (1871)
- Op. 13 Vinter og Vaar (Winter and Spring, Cantata for Chorus and Orchestra, 1872)
- Op. 13a Five Melodies for Mezzo or Bariton and Piano (dedicated to Signe Puggaard)
- Dæmring (Prelude to the Ballet Valdemar, Choreography by August Bournonville, 1872)
- Korsikaneren (Corsica transferees - Singspiel after Ludovic de Jules-Henri Vernoy de Saint-Georges, 1873)
- Op. 14 Third String Quartet, in A minor
- Op. 14a Romances and Songs, for Voice and Piano (1871)
- Op. 15 Fra Aarets Tider. To i Baaden (Songs for Men Chorus, 1875)
- Op. 15a Three Melodies
- Op. 16 Arabesque and Caprice, for Piano (dedicated to Ferdinand Hiller - 1876)
- Op. 17 Third Sonata for Piano, in F major (1879)
- Op. 18 Scherzo (for orchestra, Published as Nordic folk dance No. 1 - The dances Op. 3a, 2, 6a and 6b were collected in a Suite called "Nordic folk dances")
- Op. 19 Violin Concerto, in G minor (1879, dedicated to Joseph Joachim)
- Op. 20 Fourteen Small Songs for the Youth (Works from his childhood, published in 1877)
- Op. 21 Four Songs for Intermediary Voice and Piano (I Storm, Nattergalen, Myggevise, Aftensang)
- Op. 22 Christines Sange, Religious Songs for Voice and Piano (1877)
- Op.23 Ballscenen, Taenze und Arabesken, for Piano (Suite comprising: Introduction, Graceful Waltz, Polka, Menuet, Intermezzo I - la Coquette, Cross dance, Waltz, Furious Gallop, Intermezzo II - Love scene, Zipline, FInal Waltz - printed in 1880)
- Op. 24 Serenade for Clarinet, Cello and Piano, in A major (1877)
- Op. 25 Hærmændene på Helgeland (in German: Eine Nordische Heerfahrt, Concert Overture after Henrik Ibsen, 1878)
- Op. 26 Cello Concerto, in D minor (ca. 1879)
- Op. 27 Four Songs for Men Chorus
- Op. 28 Three Mazurkas for Piano (1881)
- Op. 29 Fourth Symphony (Published as No. 1), in E♭ major (1879)
- Op. 30 Skandinavisk Folkemusik (50 Pieces for the Piano, some of which he later orchestrated and arranged in four suites for orchestra - 1881)
- Op. 31 Four Piano Pieces (Entitled respectively: Elegi, Impromptu, Canzonetta, Etude - 1889)
- Op. 32 A Carnival Fest (Suite of dances for orchestra, comprising a March, a Mazurka, an Introduction and Waltz, an Intermezzo and a final Tarentella -1882)
- Op. 33 Towards the Light (Cantata after Martin Kok for Chorus and orchestra)
- Jean-Marie (Stage music, 1883)
- Op. 34 Fifth Symphony (Published as No. 2), in A minor, Fra Riddertiden (From Knights' Time) (published in 1887)
- Op. 34a Im Mondschein (I Maaneskin), Introduction and Waltz for Orchestra (1887)
- Op. 35a Lieder und Gesaenge, for Voice and Piano, vol 1 comprising six melodies (1886)
- Op. 35b Lieder und Gesaenge, for Voice and Piano, vol 2 comprising six other melodies (1886)
- Op. 36 Fire Sange i Folketone (1886)
- Op. 37 Fourth String Quartet, in C minor (1885)
- Op. 39 Dance Suite for Orchestra (Comprising a Polka, a Waltz and a Gallop - 1887)
- Op. 40 Hakon Jarl (Symphonic Poem, dedicated to his daughter Agnete Lehmann - 1886)
- Op. 41 Norsk Lyrik, Songs for Voice and Piano (Cycle of 14 songs, on Norwegian poems, dedicated to his daughter Bodil Neergaard -1890)
- Op. 42 Sixth Symphony (Published as No. 3), in D major (dedicated to the Royal Chapel in Berlin, 1887)
- Op. 43 Serenade (Nonet) for Flute, Oboe, 2 Clarinets, 2 Bassoons, 2 Horns, Violoncello and Double Bass (ca.1885)
- Op. 44 Scottish Overture (Orchestra, 1890)
- Christian den Anden (Christian II, Incidental music for a play by Jenny Blicher, 1889)
- Scandinavian Fest March (for Orchestra, ca. 1889)
- Op. 45 Dyvekesuite (Incidental music for the play Kristian den Anden, arranged as a Suite for Small Orchestra, and comprising the following pieces: Narren, Bondedans, Dyveke danser for Kongen, Fredløs, Romance, Folkedans, Afskeden - ca. 1890)
- Conzerthaus-Polka (Orchestra, 1891)
- Op. 46 Ouverture Pastorale (for Orchestra, 1869)
- Op. 47 Piano concerto, in F minor (Dedicated to Julius Roentgen, 1891)
- A Storm in a Tea Cup (Incidental music to a play by Helge Hostrup, 1892)
- The Island of Sydhavet (Øen I Sydhavet, Incidental music to a play by Holger Drachmann, 1893)
- Op. 49 Seventh Symphony (numbered as No. 4), in D minor (1893)
- Ragnhild (Runenzauber in German, or Magical runes, Opera after Henrik Hertz, 1896)
- Wedding Festival in Hardanger (En Bryllupsfest i Hardanger, Ballet, 1897)
- Det store Lod (Comic Opera after Henrik Hertz, 1898)
- By Summertime (Ved Sommertiden, Cantata for Chorus and Orchestra)
- Rinaldo (Cantata for Solo, Chorus and Orchestra)
- Idyll (Cantata for Soprano, Tenor and Orchestra)
- Bellmanske Sange (for four voices dame chorus)
- 4 Spiritual Songs
- 6 Quartets for Male Voices (1880)
- Efterklang til Tyrfing (after the poetry of Henrik Hertz)
- Fourth Piano Sonata, in G minor (Last movement unfinished)
- Det døende barn (The dying child, Song for Voice and Piano after Hans Christian Andersen)
- Berceuse for Violin and Piano, in E major
- Many other unpublished works, and in particular songs and piano music, mainly from his younger years.

== Sources ==
- Bodil Neergaard, Hendes Slaegt og Virke skildret af Slaegt og Venner i Anledning af Hendes 80-aars Dag, Koebenhavn 1947
- Soerensen, Inger, Hartmann, Et Dansk Komponistdynasti, Koebenhavn 1999, 656 pages
- Soerensen, Inger, JPE Hartmann og Hans kreds. En komponistfamilies breve 1780-1900, bd 1–4, Koebenhavn 1999–1900, 2452 pages
- Soerensen, Inger, Emil Hartmann, Koebenhavn, 2020
- Kritischer Bericht ueber die Aufuehrungen der Compositionen von Emil Hartmann, Koebenhavn, 1896
