= Zinn House =

Historic townhouse in Copenhagen, Denmark

- Zinns Gård
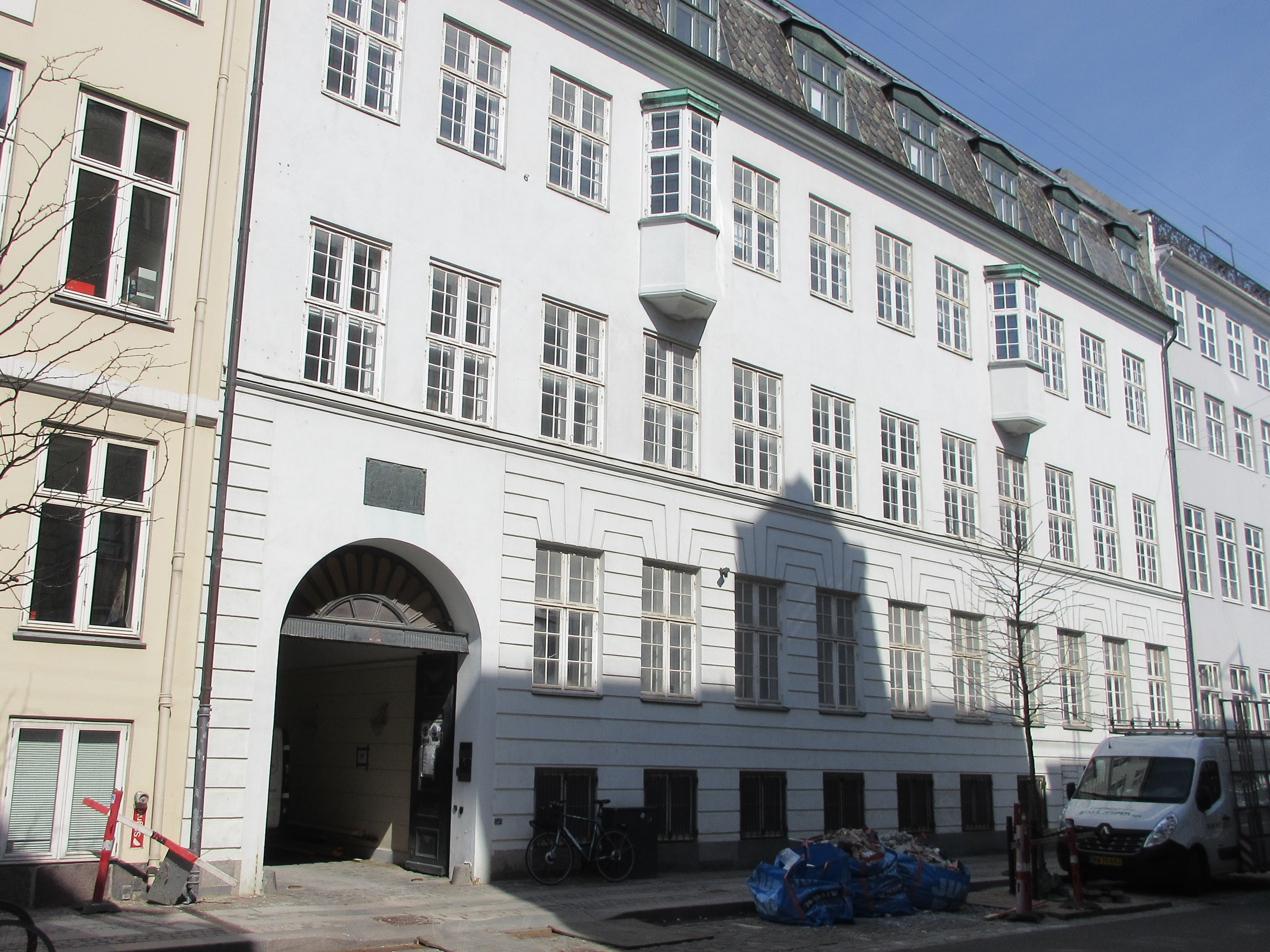
- Interactive map of the Zinn House area

General information
- Location: Copenhagen, Denmark
- Coordinates: 55°40′42.02″N 12°34′55.96″E
- Completed: 1751
- Renovated: 1812 (heightened)
- Client: Hinrich Ladiges

The Zinn House (Danish: Zinnske Gård), located at Kvæsthusgade 3, is a historic townhouse around the corner from the Nyhavn Canal in central Copenhagen, Denmark. It takes its name from the Zinn family, a wealthy family of merchants who owned it for more than 150 years. The composer Johan Peter Emilius Hartmann, who was married to Emma Sophie Amalie Zinn, a granddaughter of Johann Ludvig Zinn, lived on the second floor for more than 70 years in the period 1829–1900. The building was adapted in 1907. It was later in the century converted into offices. The building was listed on the Danish registry of protected buildings and places in 1959.

== History ==
=== Oluf Blach ===
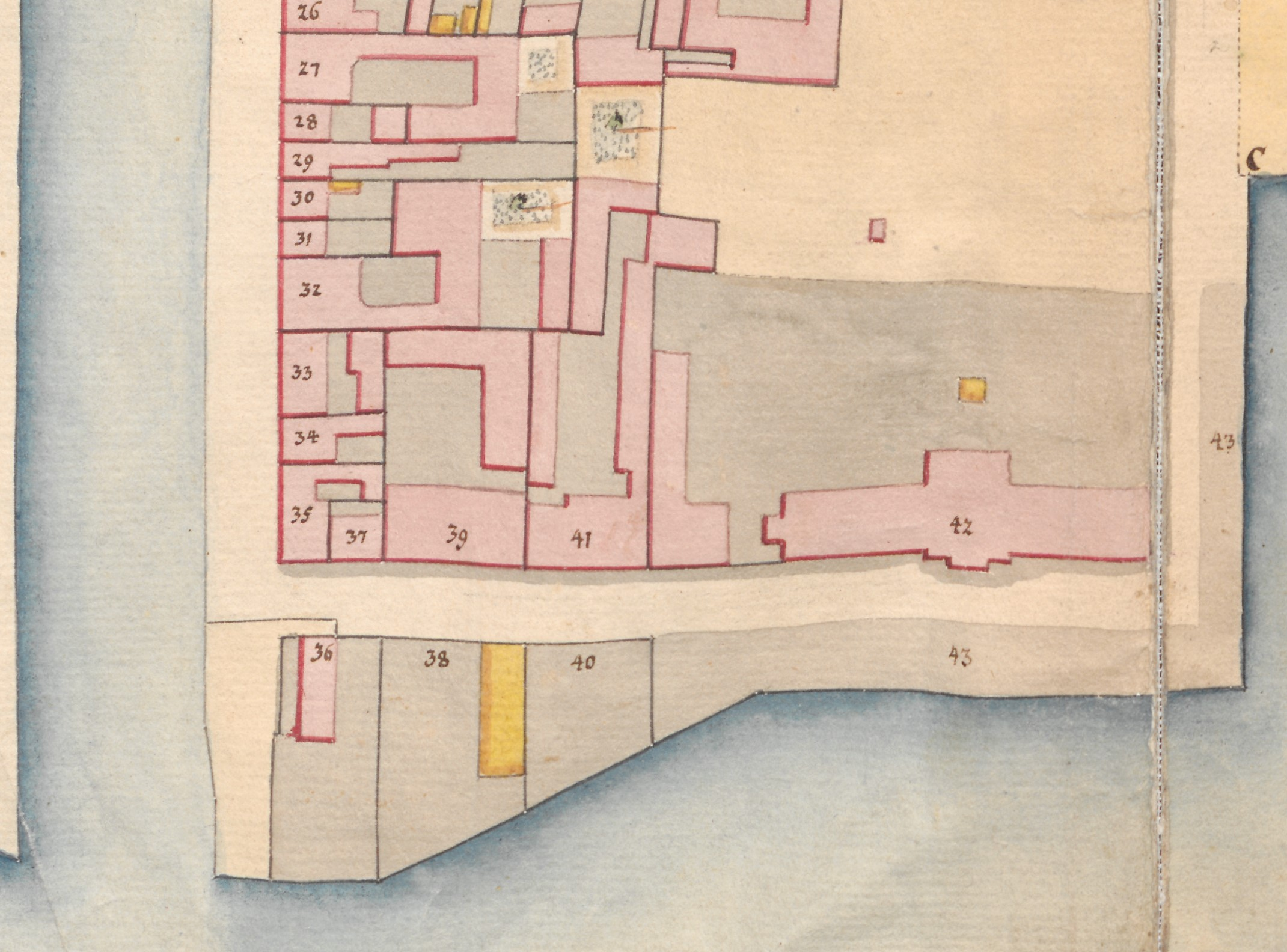
No. 39 seen in a detail from Christian Gedde's map of St. Ann's East Quarter, 1757

The site was in 1689 part of a larger property (No. 21, St. Ann's East Quarter) owned by Nikolaj Veisling. It was built over with two storeys in 1751 for the merchant Oluf Blach (1694–1767). He had made a fortune in North Atlantic trade and would later serve as managing director of the General Trading Company. The property was in 1756 as No. 39 still owned by Blach.

=== Zinn family ===
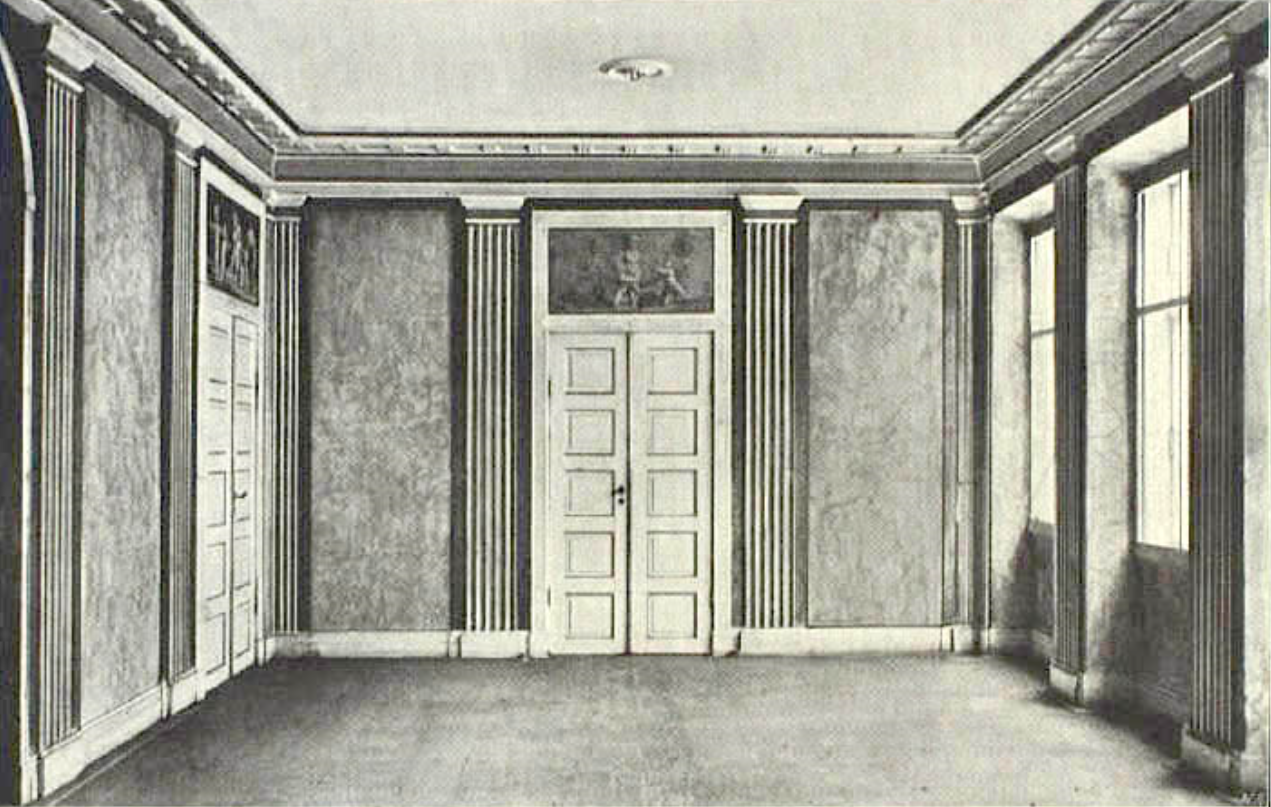
The Zinn family's music room

The building was later acquired by another wealthy merchant, Johann Ludvig Zinn, who came to Denmark to work for Fabritius & Wewer in 1757 and established his own trading house in 1765. His daughter, Sophie Dorthea Zinn, described everyday life in the building in her memoirs Grandma's Confessions (Grandmamas Bekjendelser). It is believed that the Zinn House was the first place in Denmark where the La Marseillaise was sung. It happened during a dinner for a delegation of French business partners on 20 January 1794 where Honoré-Nicolas-Marie Duveyrier was among the guests. Sophie Zinn persuaded him to sing the song, although "revolutionary songs" were highly controversial in Denmark at the time. Duveyrier sent her the score and lyrics the following day. Zinn was fond of music, and his home often played host to soirées.

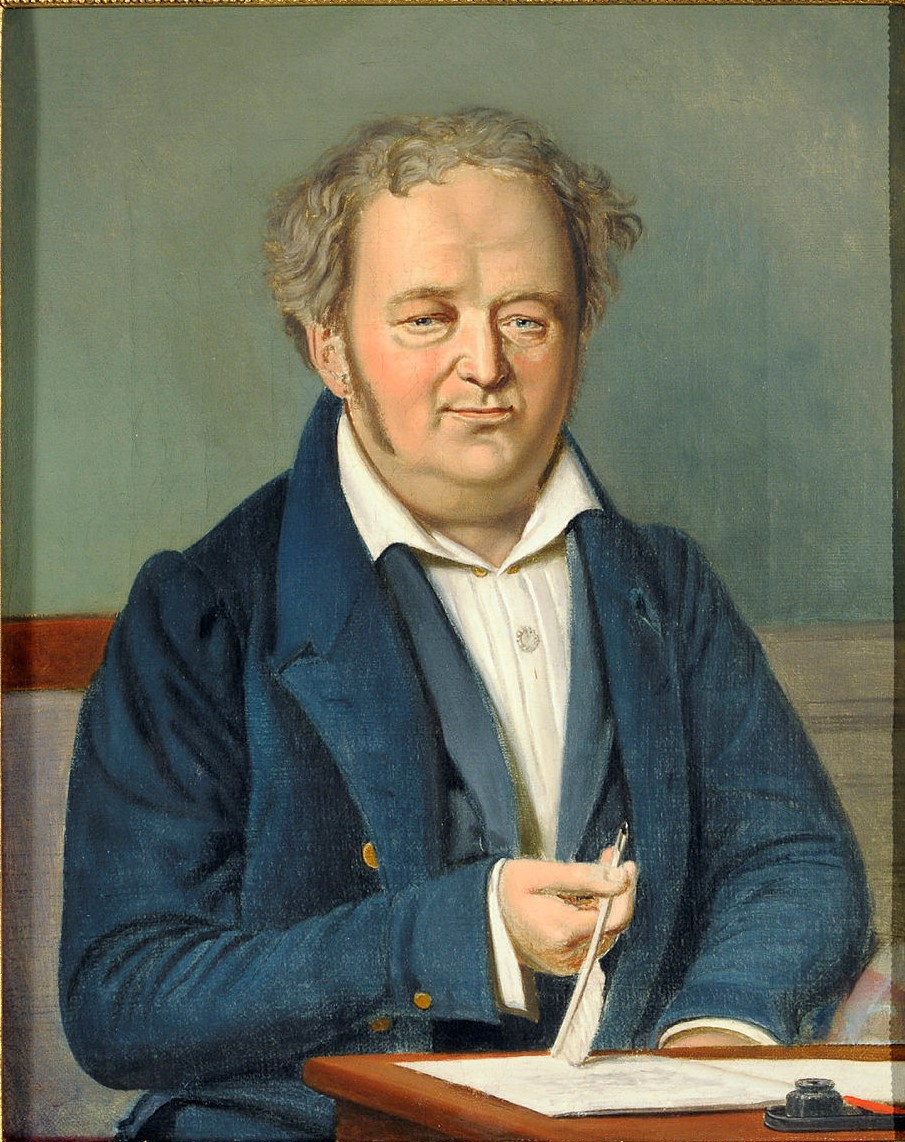
Johan Friederich Zinn

Zinn's two sons, Carl Ludvig Zinn (1777–1808) and Johan Friedrich Zinn (1779–1838), took on the family's trading company after his death in 1802. Johan became the sole owner of the company when his elder brother died in 1808. He heightened the building in Kvæsthusgade with one floor in 1812. The company was later passed on to Johan Friedrich Zinn's son Ludvig Maximilian Zinn.

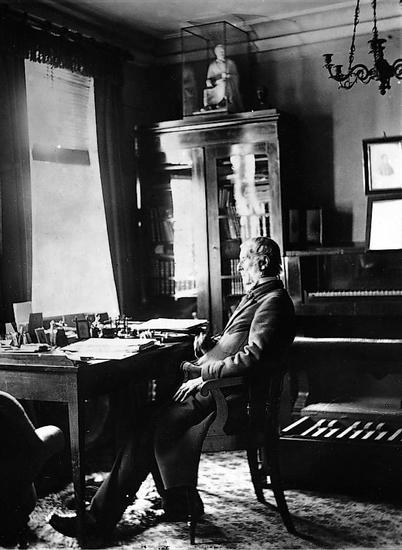
J.P.E. Hartmann in his study

Johan Friedrich Zinn's daughter, Emma Sophie Amalie, married the composer Johan Peter Emilius Hartmann. The couple lived on the second floor. Hartmann served as organist at the nearby Garrison Church from 1724 to 1843 and thereafter in the cathedral. He stayed in the apartment after his wife's death and inhabited it until his own death in 1900. Other composers of the family lived there, in particular Emil Hartmann, but also at times Niels W. Gade and August Winding. Also composers Asger Hamerik and C.F.E. Horneman belonged to the Zinn family and resided for a while in the house.

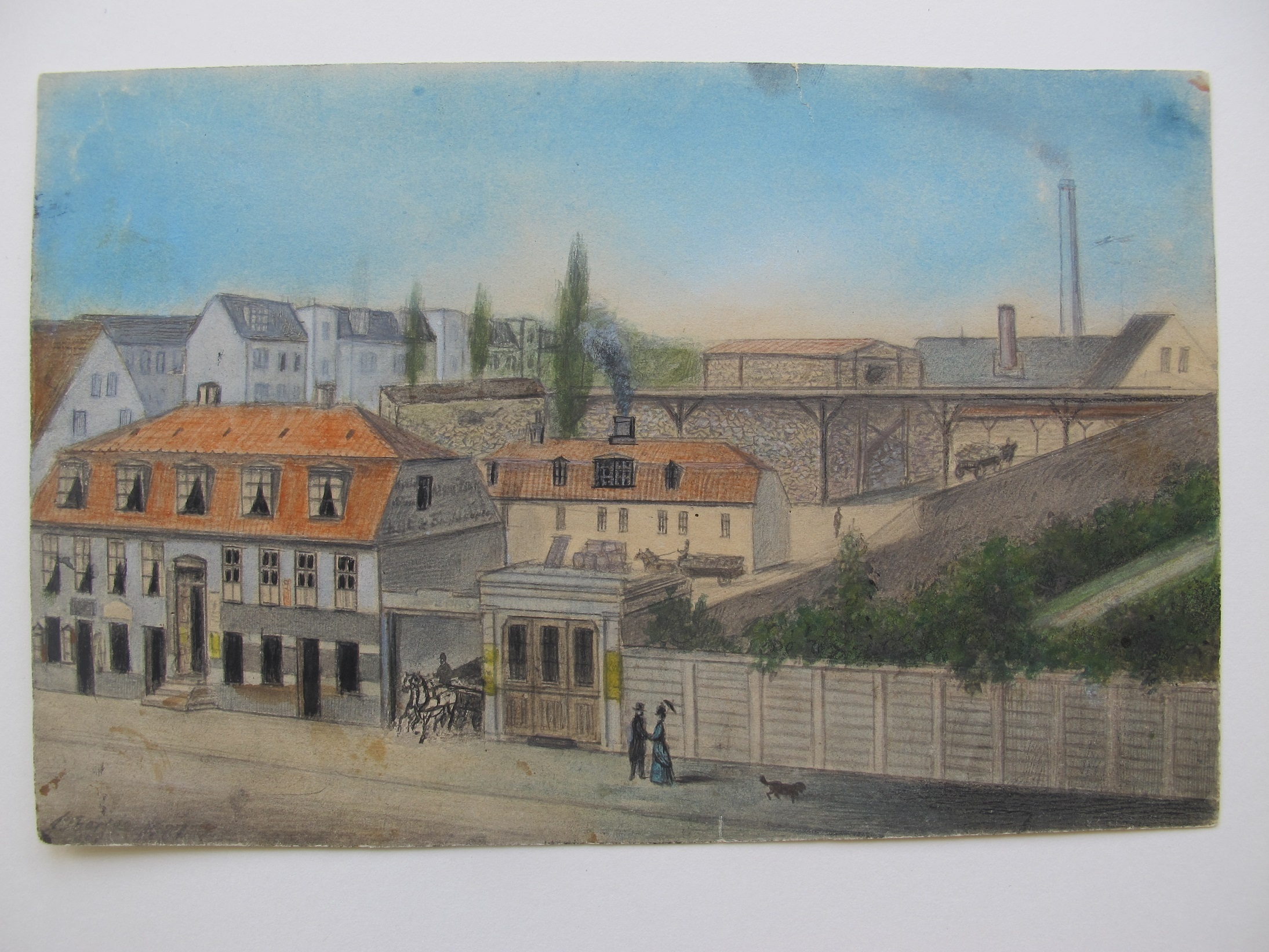
Adolf Johannes Zinn's property on Kvæsthusgade.

The journalist Jens Giødwad, editor of the magazine Fædrelandet, was a resident in the building from 1870 to circa 1874. The artist Johan Rohde lived in the building in 1903–04.

The last member of the Zinn family yo own the property was Adolf Johannes Zinn. He was then grand son of Johan Friederich Zinn.

=== Later owners ===
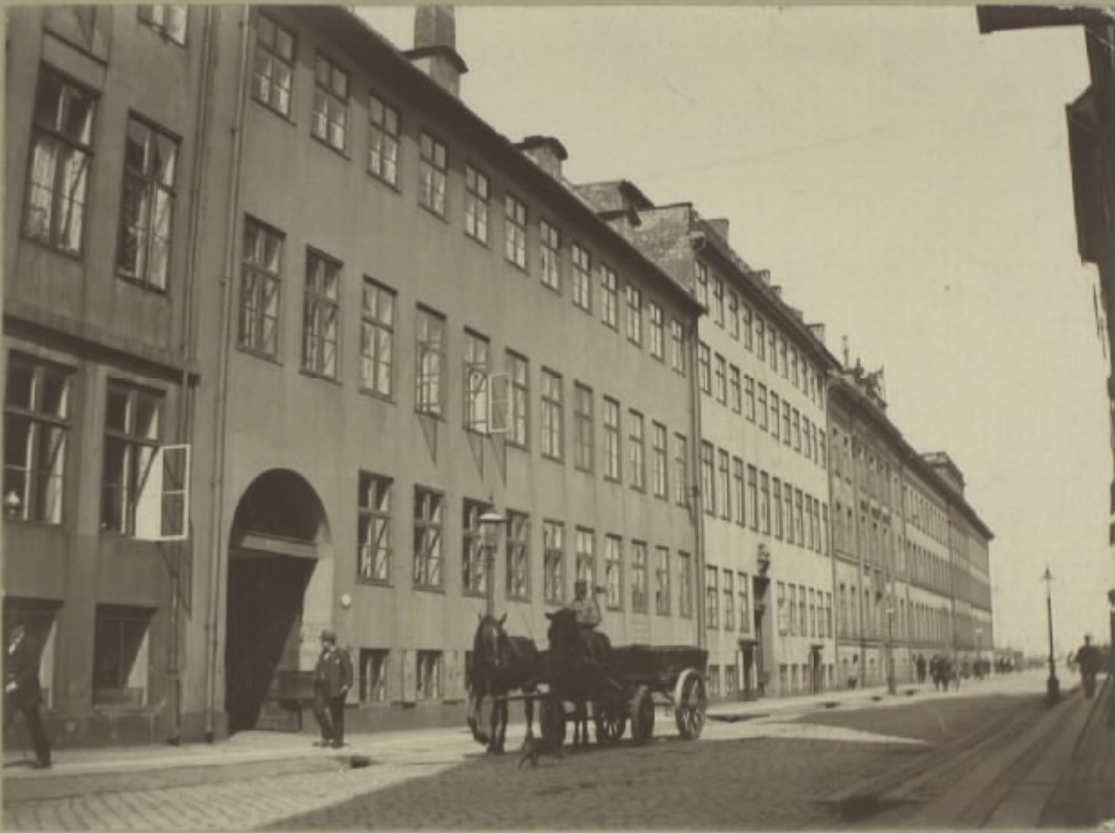
The house prior to the alterations in 1907

In the 1900s the Zinn House was purchased by Alfred Olsen & Co., an oil company founded by Alfred and Otto Olsen, in 1901, which had until then been based at Nyhavn 51. Otto died in 1906. The company prospered during World War I. In 1915 Alfred Olsen commissioned the young architect Terkel Jhejle to refurbish the building. In 1916, he purchased the estate Egebæksvang at Nærum and commissioned Hjejle to expand the main building with a new wing. Olsen's wife, Olufa Olsen, née Bøjesen, died in 1917.

The company's name was changed to the Danish-American Gulf Oil Company in 1946.

During Nazi Germany's occupation of Denmark, Erik Bennike operated a weapons manufactory in the building. On 17 April 1945, he and two other resistance fighters were surprised by a German razzia. Bennike was killed in a shoot-out while the two others managed to escape.

== Architecture ==
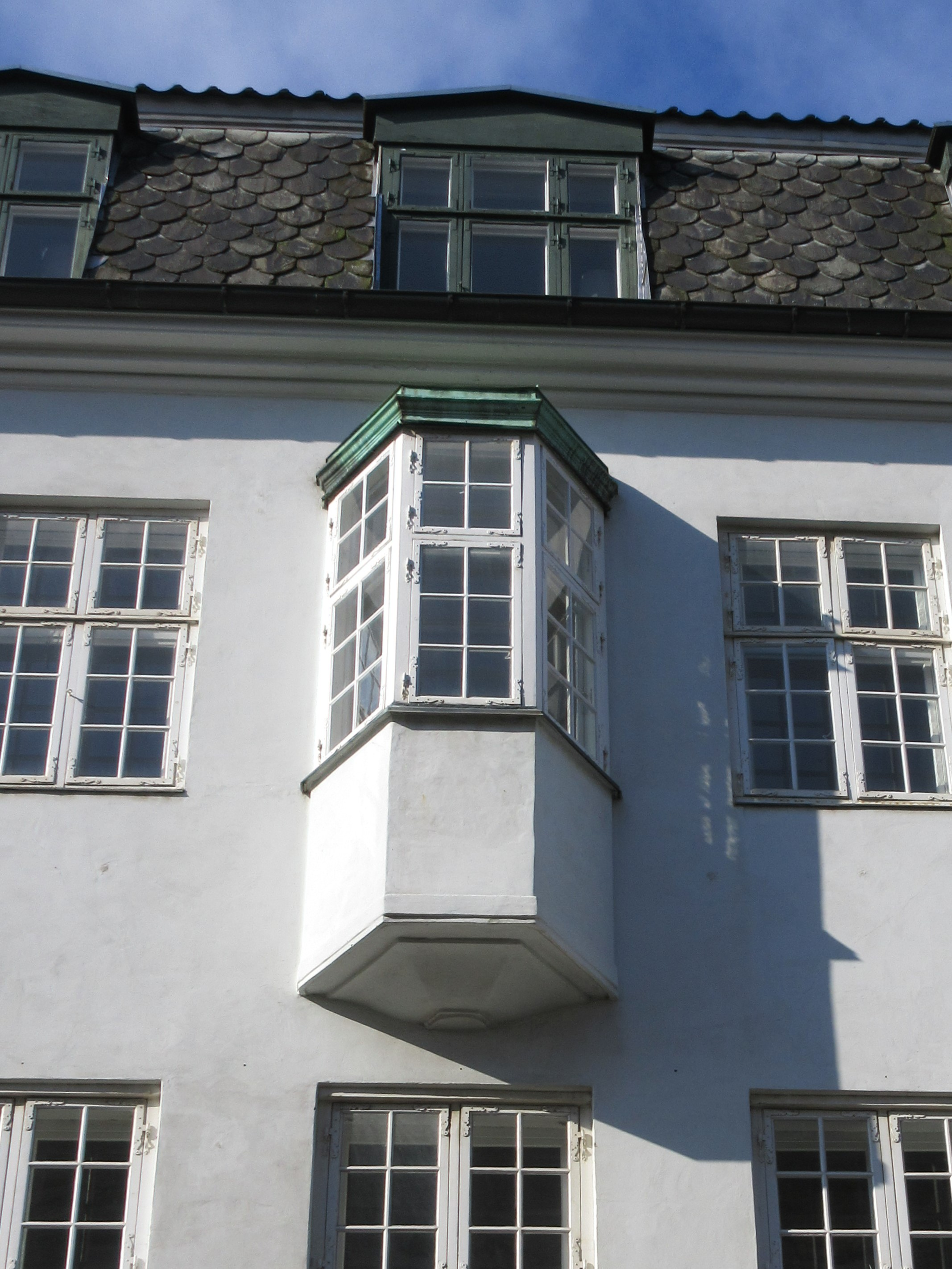
One of the oriel windows

The building consists of three floors over a high cellar and is 12 bays wide. The two oriel windows on the third floor date from the renovation in 1907. The original saddle roof was also replaced by a mansard roof with eight dormers at this point.

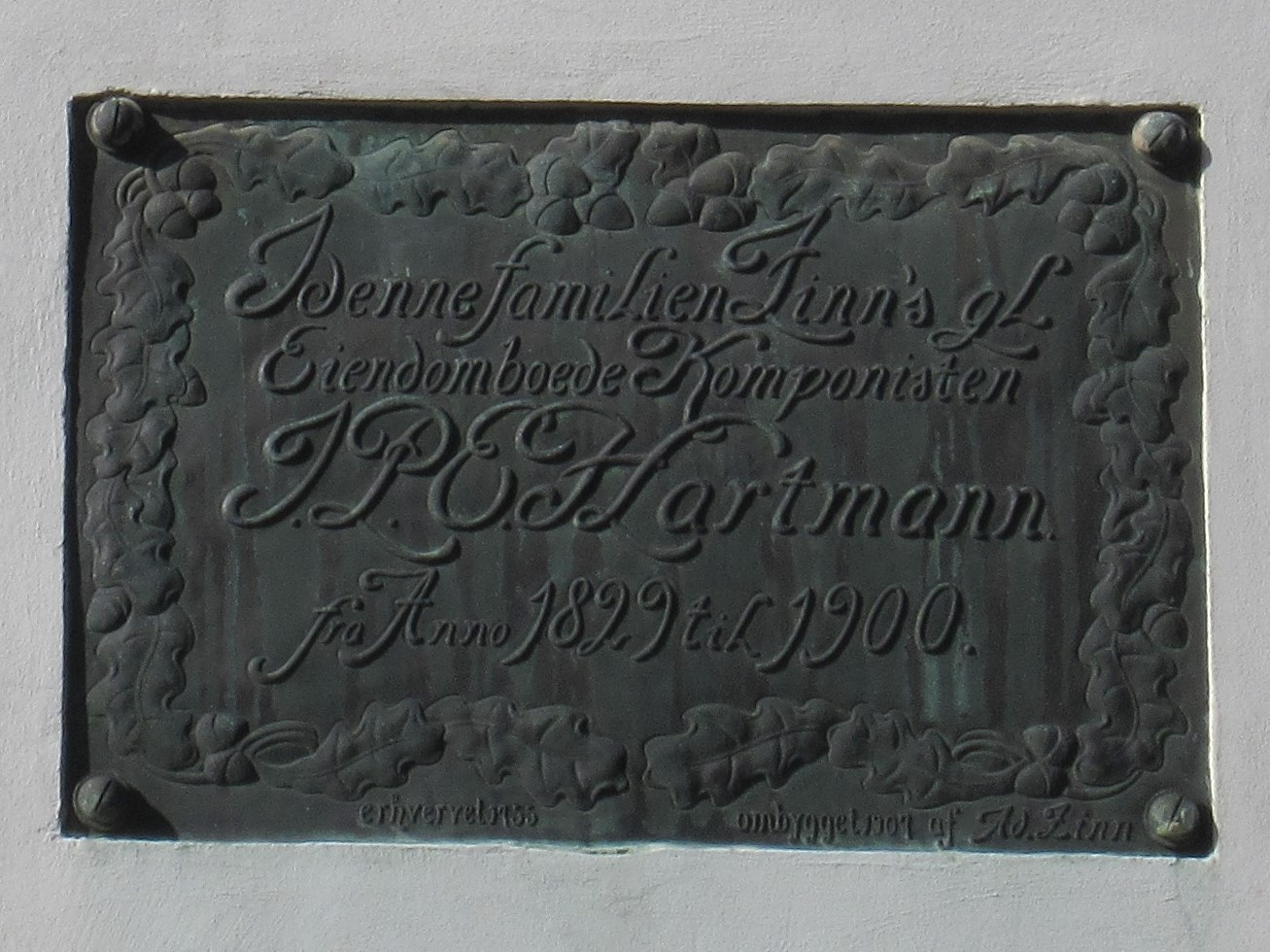
The Hartmann plaque

Above the gateway is a plaque that commemorates that Hartmann lived in the building from 1829 to 1900. It also mentions that the Zinn family acquired the building in 1751 and that it was renovated in 1907.

The complex also comprises a side wing along the north side of a central courtyard and a rear wing. The building fronting the street was listed on the Danish registry of protected buildings and places in 1959, but the side wing and rear were not listed on 6 April 1959.

== Today ==
The building is now owned by Nordea Properties. They have converted the building from offices back to apartments with the assistance of Holsøe Arkitekter.

== Notable residents ==
- Oluf Blach (1794–1767), merchant
- Johann Ludvig Zinn (1734–1892), merchant
- Sophie Thalbitzer (1774–1851), memoirist
- Johan Peter Emilius Hartmann (1805–1900), composer
- Emma Hartmann (1807–1851), composer
- Lars Hjortshøj (born 1967), comedian
- Tina Builsbo (born 1862), journalist
- Thomas Delaney (born 1991), footballer
- Caroline Henderson (born 1962), singer, resident 2018–2020
