= Elverskud =

Ballad

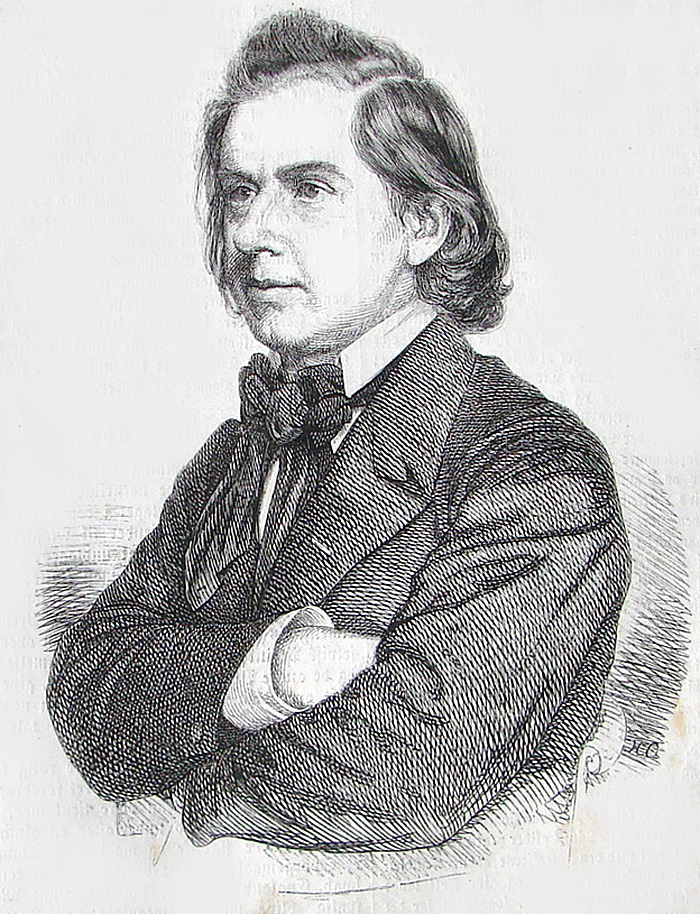
Niels Gade in 1860

Elverskud is a ballad for soloist, choir and orchestra by Niels W. Gade from 1854.

Gade's oeuvre contains many concert pieces of various lengths for orchestra, choir and soloists. Depending on which one counts, there are up to 16 of them, mostly referred to as "cantata". The longest of the pieces can take up to an hour. Some of the pieces are almost semi-operas or concert operas with dramatic development.

== Origins ==
The plot of the song comes from the Danish folk-ballad Elveskud.

In 1842 Gade wrote "Agnete og Havfruerne" for solo, female choir and orchestra with text by Hans Christian Andersen, and the same Andersen had in 1846 premiered the opera "Liden Kirsten" with music by Gade's father-in-law J. P. E. Hartmann. Both were inspired by Danish folksongs. This may have encouraged Gade to try his hand at the same set of motifs with a major concert piece.

The earliest information on Elverskud is a mention in a letter from Gade in 1849, in which he wrote that he had allowed Hans Christian Andersen to prepare a text. For whatever reason it was never used by Gade, but a draft can be found among Andersen's papers. Some parts of the text were transferred to the final version. The next person who turned his hand to this text was Christian Molbech in whose papers there is a version that is closer to the final one, which by all accounts was developed by Gade's cousin Carl Andersen and the editor Gottlieb Siesby, while the atmospheric choral interlude "I østen stiger solen op" was written already in 1837 by B. S. Ingemann and received a tune by C. E. F. Weyse the same year.

The first sheet of Gade's score is dated December 12, 1851, but in March 1853 the work is mentioned a letter to Gade from his wife, suggesting that he had no time to work on it. In early 1854 the work was published in a piano arrangement by a German publisher as "Ballade nach dänischen Volkssagen". On 30 March 1854, it was first performed at a subscription concert at the Musikforeningen, presented as a ballad for soloist, choir and orchestra.

== Plot summary ==
The ballad is divided into five sections, a prologue, three "acts" and an epilogue.

- The prologue sets the scene: Sir Oluf has been seduced by some elf-maidens.
- The first part starts with the chorus saying that Sir Oluf is to be married, but the situation goes awry when Oluf, to his mother's amazement, wants to ride out one night. He explains how he is torn between his golden-haired and blue-eyed bride-to-be and the elf-king's daughter, black-haired, bold and daring. Despite his mother's warnings, Oluf rides away.
- The second part starts with Oluf's cautious ride through the dark and ominous forest where he meets the elf-maidens. The Elf King's daughter urges him to stay, but he refuses. She curses him, but he escapes and rides back home.
- Part 3: the choir sings "I østen stiger solen op" ("In the east the Sun Rises") and the mother is worried, but not yet aware of what has happened. As Oluf arrives, it is with death as a companion.
- Epilogue: the choir sings the short moral that one should stay away from Elverhøj.

== The music ==
Gade was apparently keen to emphasize that the music was not adaptations of folk songs, but rather all his own, but inspired by the ballads. Heard today, Elverskud fits the Danish romance style, particularly in the section where Oluf, the mother and the choir "talk" to each other in opera style.

Elverskud has been shown to be one of the most popular Gade's works. According to a statement in Inger Sørensen's book, it was performed at least 184 times in Gade's life, a success unparalleled by other Danish composers. The work remains popular today, and two of the songs, "I østen stiger solen op" and "Så tit jeg rider mig under ø" are often played as single pieces.

== Sources ==
- Inger Sørensen: Niels W. Gade, et dansk verdensnavn 2002
- Sønderholm, Erik, "Elverskud: H.C. Andersen og Chr. K.F. Molbech". Musik II:9 (1968), pp. 4–9. (Udgivelse og kommentering af de to digteres tekstudkast til Niels W. Gades Elverskud.)
- Full text at Wikimedia Commons
