= Emma Hartmann =

Danish composer (1807–1851)

Amalia Hartmann
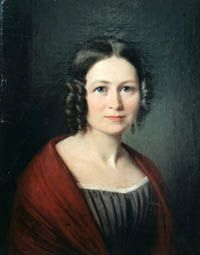
- Born: Amalia Emma Sophie Zinn; August 22, 1807; Copenhagen, Denmark
- Died: March 6, 1851 (aged 43)
- Resting place: Garrison Cemetery, Copenhagen
- Other names: Frederik H. Palmer
- Spouse: Johan Peter Emilius Hartmann (m. 1829)
- Children: Emil Hartmann; Carl Hartmann
- Relatives: Johann Ludvig Zinn (Grandfather)

Amalia Emma Sophie Hartmann née Zinn (22 August 1807 – 6 March 1851) was a Danish composer who composed under the pseudonym Frederik H. Palmer. She was married to the composer Johan Peter Emilius Hartmann (1805–1900). They lived on the second floor of the Zinn House at Kvæsthusgade 3 in Copenhagen.

== Early life ==
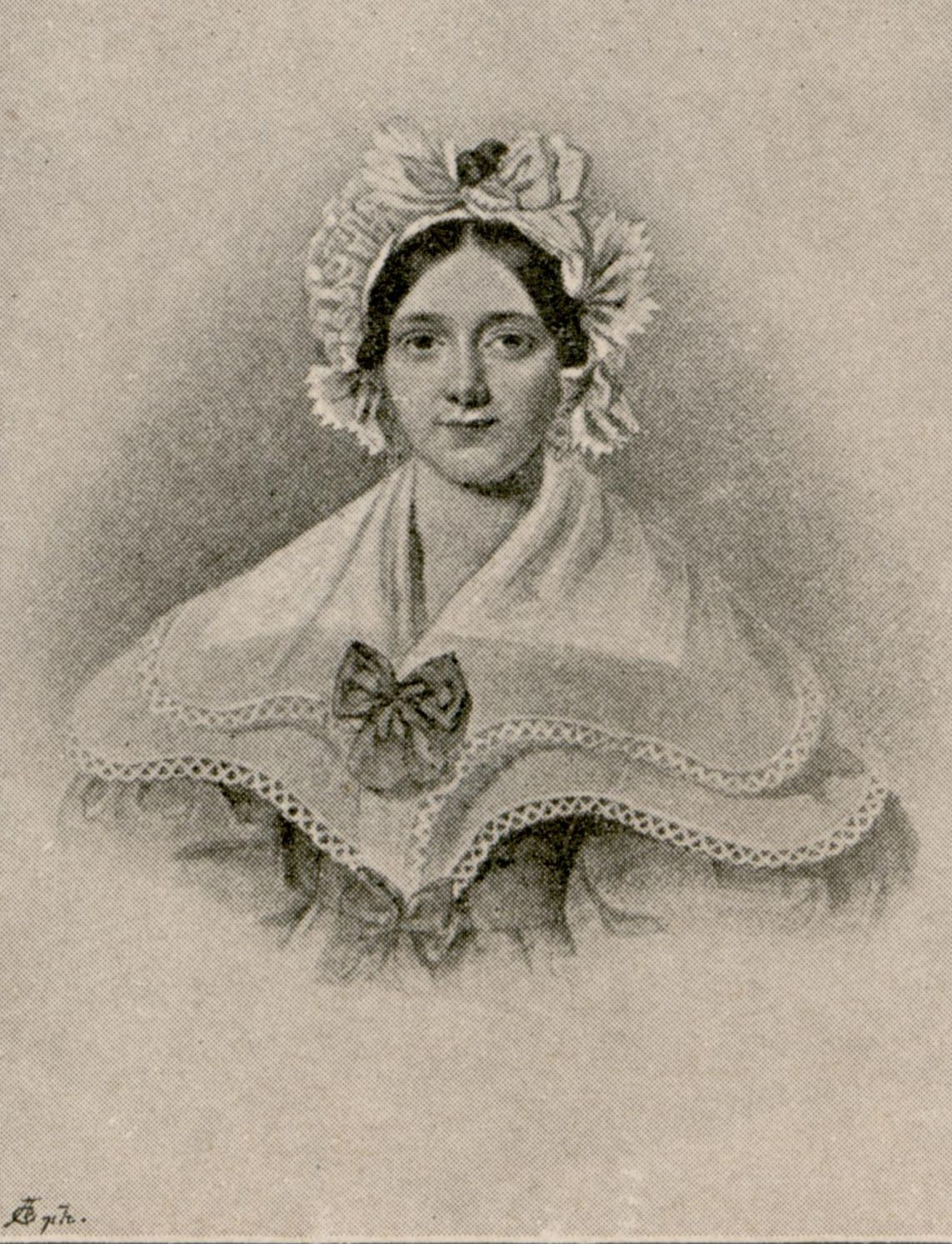
Emma Hartmann

Emma Zinn was born into a wealthy merchant family in Copenhagen. She was the daughter of Johann Friederich Zinn (1779–1838) and Eva Sophie Juliane Oldeland (1779–1812). Her father had inherited the family's trading house after the death of his father Johann Ludvig Zinn in 1802, initially in a partnership with his brother Carl Ludvig Zinn who died in 1808. Emma grew up in the Zinn House at Kvæsthusgade 3 and studied singing and piano with composer Andreas Peter Berggreen (1801–1880).

== Compositions ==
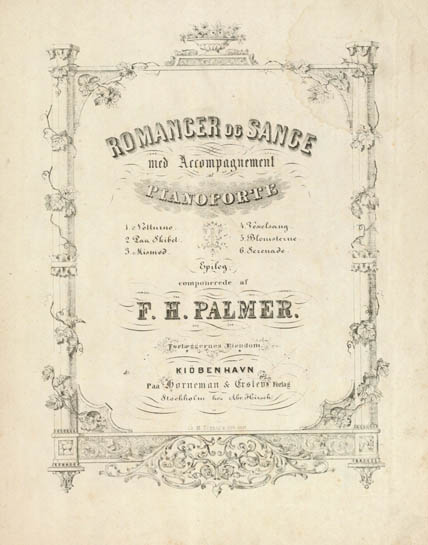
Title leaf from the publication of the fifth volume of Hartmann's romances, 1853

Her first published composition was music for a Student Association dance in February 1841. Five pamphlets with a total of 22 Romances and Songs were later published with lyrics by prominent names including Christian Winther, Frederik Paludan-Müller and Swedish Johan Ludvig Runeberg. The first pamphlet was published in 1848 by Horneman & Erslev but the last two were published posthumously. The title lead featured both her real name and her pseudonym when her collected romances and songs were published in 1892.

Her pseudonym was revealed in 1869 when the Manual of anonymity and pseudonyms in Danish literature was published.

A collection of her piano pieces was published privately by her youngest son Frederik (Fritz) Hartmann in 1908. A new issue was published by DCM in 2003.

== Personal life ==
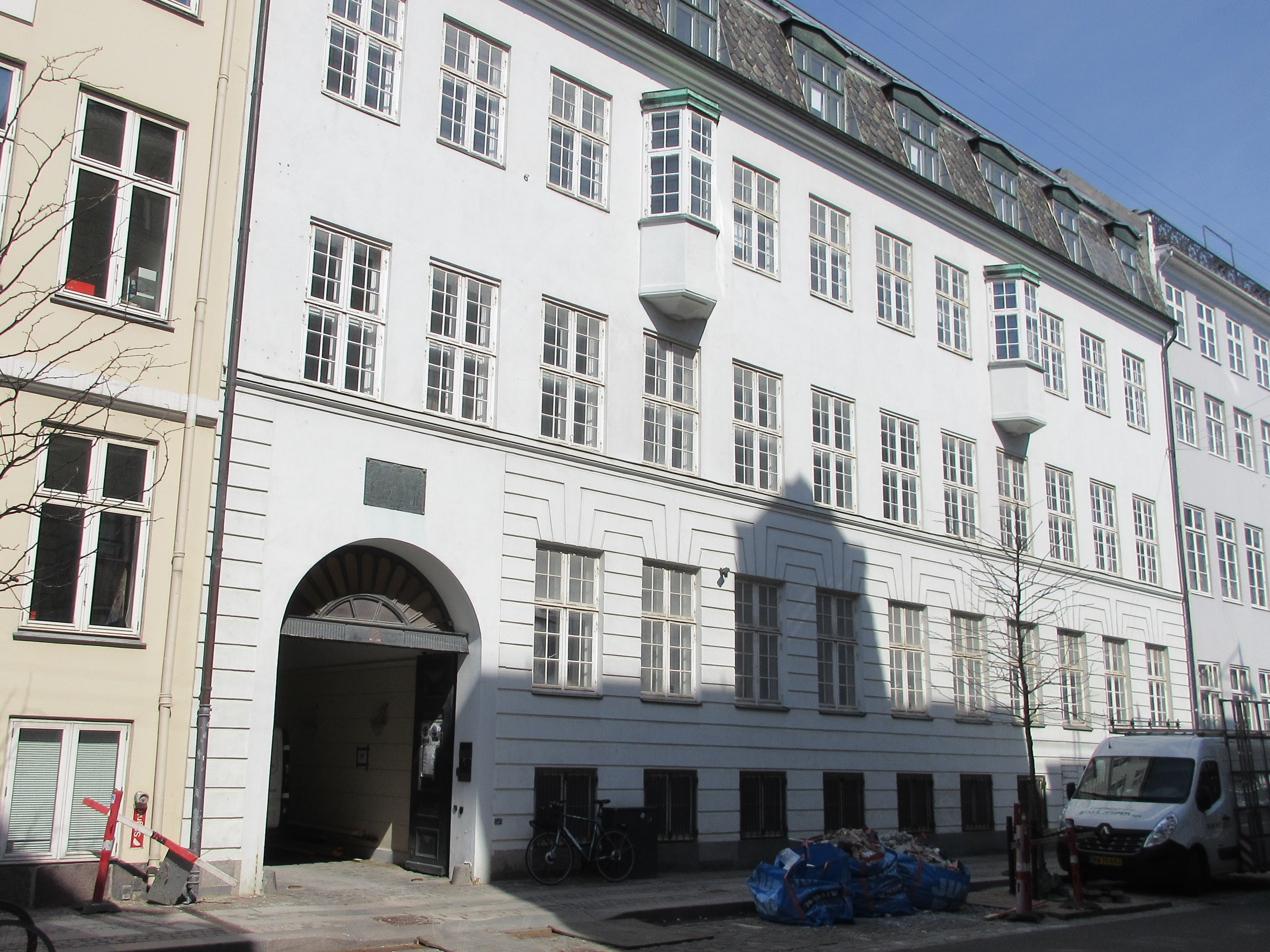
Zinn House at Kvæsthusgade 3 in Copenhagen

Emma Zinn married J.P.E. Hartmann in 1829. He then worked as organist at the Garrison Church, a position he had taken over after his father. She gave birth to 10 children of which four died as infants. She was interested in literature, art and theatre. H.C. Andersen wrote entertainingly and movingly on her in his memoirs "Mit Livs Eventyr" (second edition) and Clara Schumann in "Ehetagebuecher". She died just 43 years old on 6 March 1851 and was interred in the Garrison Cemetery in Copenhagen. Her husband outlived her by almost fifty years and remarried in 1855.

Her son Emil Hartmann was also a composer. Her daughter Emma Sophie married Danish composer Niels W. Gade and her daughter Clara married pianist and composer August Winding. Her son Carl Hartmann was a sculptor.

== Works ==
- Viennese waltz, 1841
- Galopade, 1841
- Romances and songs 1-V, 1849-53 (11 songs)
- Collected Romances and Songs, 1892 (22 songs)
- Collected piano works
- Several unpublished songs
