= Johann Ludvig Zinn =

German-Danish merchant (1734–1802)

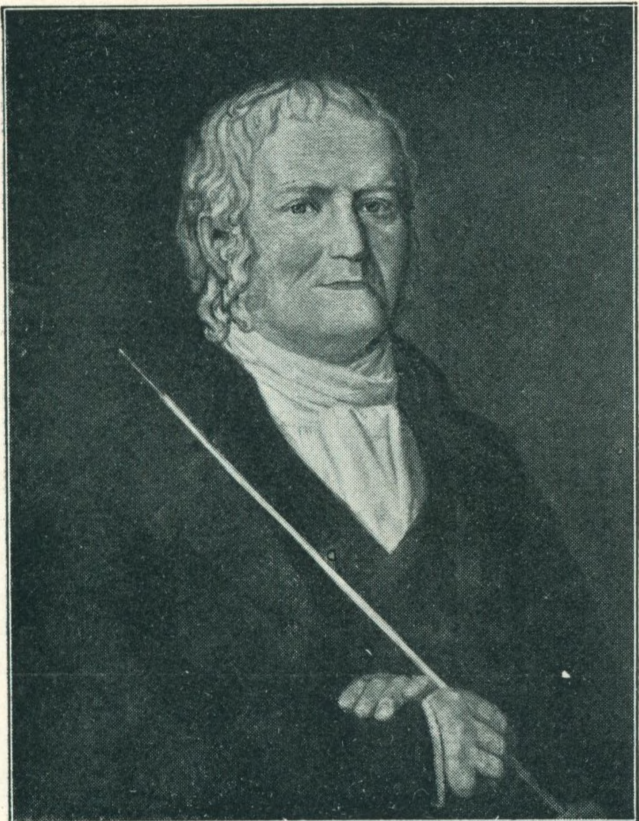
- Silhouette by
- Born: 14 September 1734; Mainbernheim, Holy Roman Empire
- Died: 3 February 1802 (aged 67); Copenhagen, Denmark
- Occupation: Merchant

Johann Ludvig Zinn (14 September 1734 – 3 February 1802) was a German-Danish merchant who founded a trading house in Copenhagen in 1765 and died as one of the wealthiest men in the city. Zinn lived in the Zinn House at Kvæsthusgade 3 in Copenhagen. His daughter, Sophie Dorothea Zinn, wrote about her father in her memoirs, Grandma's Confessions (Grandmamas Bekjendelser).

== Early life and education ==
Zinn was born in Mainbernheim in Bavaria. His parents were Johann Friederich Zinn and Dorothea Barbara Zinn, née Kreis.

== Career and public life ==
Instigated by Johan Friederich Wewer, Zinn came to Denmark in 1757, where he initially worked for Fabritius & Wewer. He established his own trading house in 1765, and was appointed Royal Agent in 1779.

Zinn served as a commercial specialist judge at Copenhagen's Maritime Court and was a member of the city's Council of 32 Men from 1772 to 1802. He also served as statutory auditor for the Danish Asia Company. In 1789, he was a member of a commission set up to regulate Copenhagen's grain reserves (Provianteringskommission), and was also president of Grosserer-Societetet, a wholesaler organization, from 1790 until his death.

== Personal life and legacy ==
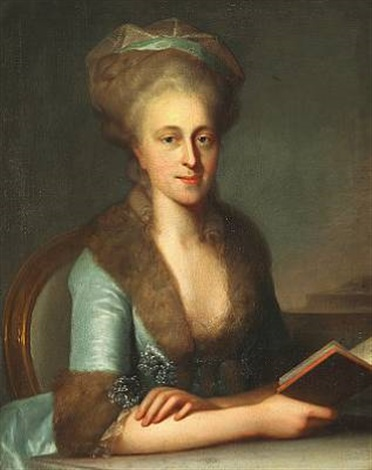
Johanne Charlotte Sophie Zinn, painted by Erik Pauelsen in 1789

Zinn married Johanna Charlotta Sophia Preisler (15 June 1754 – 3 September 1833) on 15 September 1771, daughter of professor Johan Martin Preisler at the Royal Danish Academy of Fine Arts, who himself descended from a long line of German painters, and Anna S. Schuckmann (1720–1800). She was the sister of Danish actor Joachim Daniel Preisler (1755–1809), himself married to actress Marie Cathrine Preisler (1761–1797), as well as of engraver Johann Georg Preisler (1757–1831).

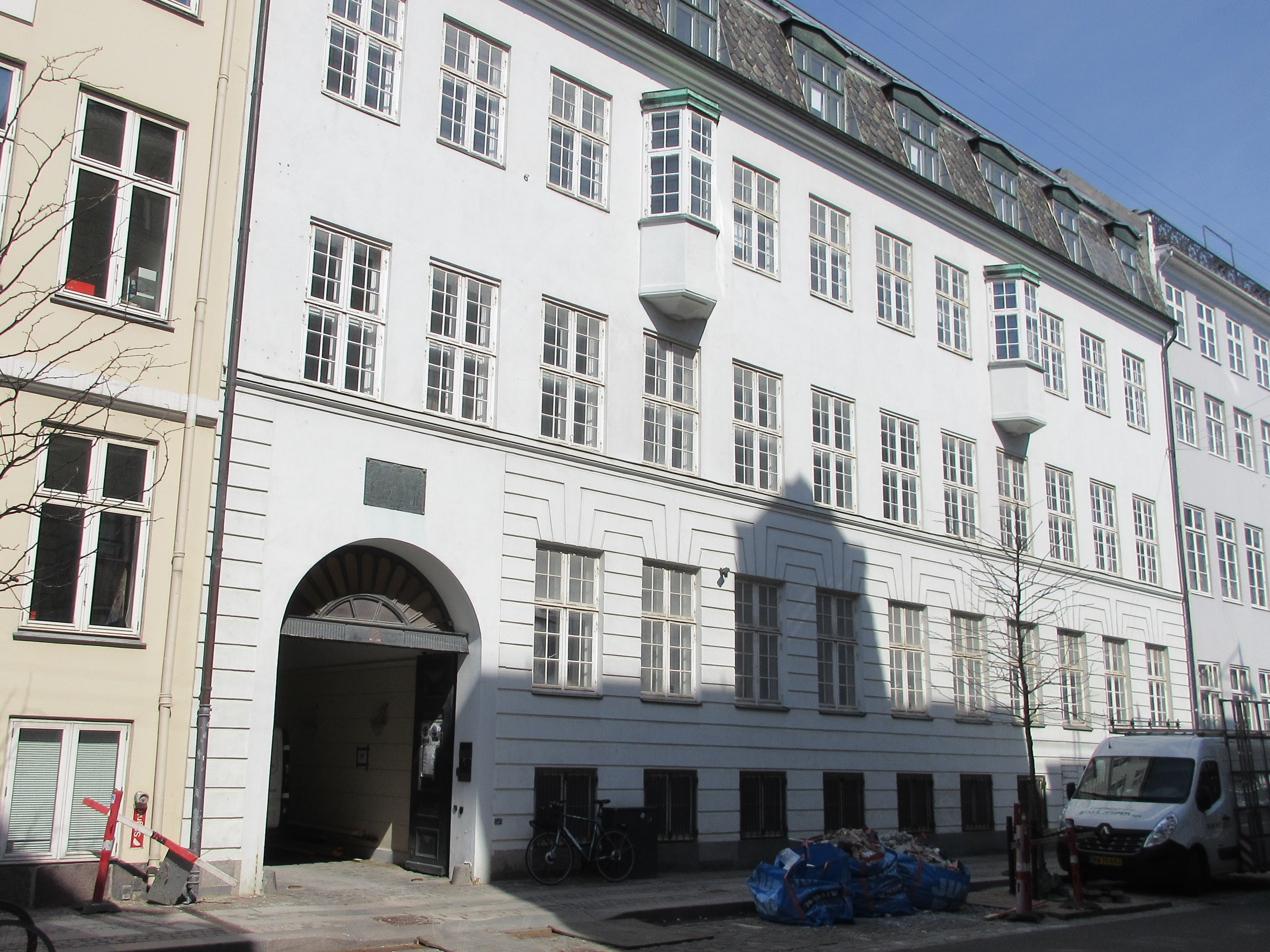
The Zinn House at Kvæsthusgade 3

The family lived in the Zinn House at Kvæsthusgade 3. Zinn was naturalized in 1793 and donated a ballot box in silver to the city of Copenhagen to show his gratitude for the way he had been received.

He died a very wealthy man on 3 February 1802 and is buried in Frederick's German Church. His two sons, Carl Ludvig Zinn (1777–1808) and Johann Friedrich Zinn (1779–1838), took on the company after their father's death. In 1809 it was the second-largest company in Copenhagen based on tax income. Carl Ludvig Zinn bought Vodroffsgård in 1803 but died in 1808. The company was later passed on to Johann Friedrichs Zinn's son Ludvig Maximilian Zinn (1808–1868). His sister, Emma Sophie Amalia, married the composer Johan Peter Emilius Hartmann.

== See also ==
- Hinrich Ladiges
