= Carl Wilhelm Thalbitzer =

Danish politician

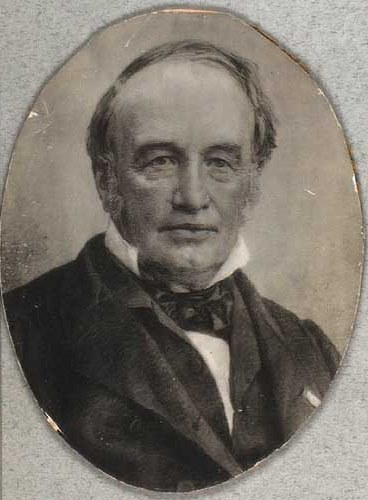
- Born: 17 March 1801; Helsingør, Denmark
- Died: 11 September 1867 (aged 66); Frederiksberg, Denmark
- Occupations: Farmer and politician

Carl Wilhelm Thalbitzer (17 March 1801 – 11 September 1867) was a Danish landowner and politician. He was a member of the 1848 Danish Constituent Assembly.

== Early life ==
Thalbitzer was born in Helsingør, the son of Consul Henry Talbitzer (1767–1818) and Sophie Dorothea Zinn (1774–1851). His maternal grand father was the wealthy Copenhagen-based merchant Johann Ludvig Zinn. He became exam.jur. in 1824.

== Landowner and local politics ==
Thalbitzer purchased the estate Cathrinebjerg in the parish of Sengeløse in 1826 and nearby Frederiksholm in 1844. He was an excellent farmer. He chaired the local parish council in 1842–44. In 1842, he was a co-founder of the local association of farmers landboforening and in 1843 of Den Frisindede Landkommunalforening and served as its chairman in 1844–46. He was a member of the County Council in 1842–62.

== National politics ==
Thalbitzer was in 1847 elected for Roskilde Provincial Assembly and later for the 1848 Danish Constituent Assembly. He joined the Society of the Friends of Peasants and voted for a unicamerali model and general suffrage. He became a board member of the Society of the Friends of Peasants in 1848–51 and was a member of the landsting from 1849 and 1864–66 also of rigsrådets landsting. He was a member of almost all committees related to agriculture.

He left the Society of the Friends of Peasants in 1855 and later joined the National Liberal Party. He voted for the revised constitution in 1866.

He was in 1851 a co-founder of Østifternes Kreditforening and served as president of its board of representatives until his death. He was also a co-founder of a local folk high school which was later converted into an agricultural school.

== Personal life ==
Thalbitzer married Elisabeth Brøndsted (1804–1871), a daughter of provost Gerhard Johan Brøndsted (1773–1846) and Charlotte Hedvig Fridsch (1777–1863), on 18 October 1826 in Asminderød Church.

He died on 11 September 1867 and is buried at Frederiksberg Old Cemetery.
