= Sophie Thalbitzer =

Danish memoirist

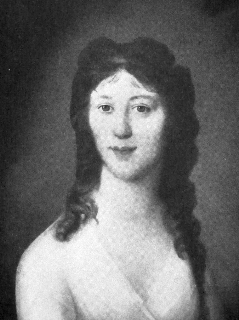
Sophie Thalbitzer

Sophie Thalbitzer (née Zinn, 15 April 1774 – 27 December 1851) was a Danish memoirist known for Grandma's Confessions (Danish: Grandmamas Bekiendelser), which offers a rare first-hand account of everyday life for a child and young woman in an upper-class bourgeois family in Copenhagen during the late 18th and early 19th century. She was a daughter of the wealthy merchant Johann Ludvig Zinn and grew up in the Zinn House at Kvæsthusgade 3. The building was listed on the Danish registry of protected buildings and places in 1959.

== Biography ==
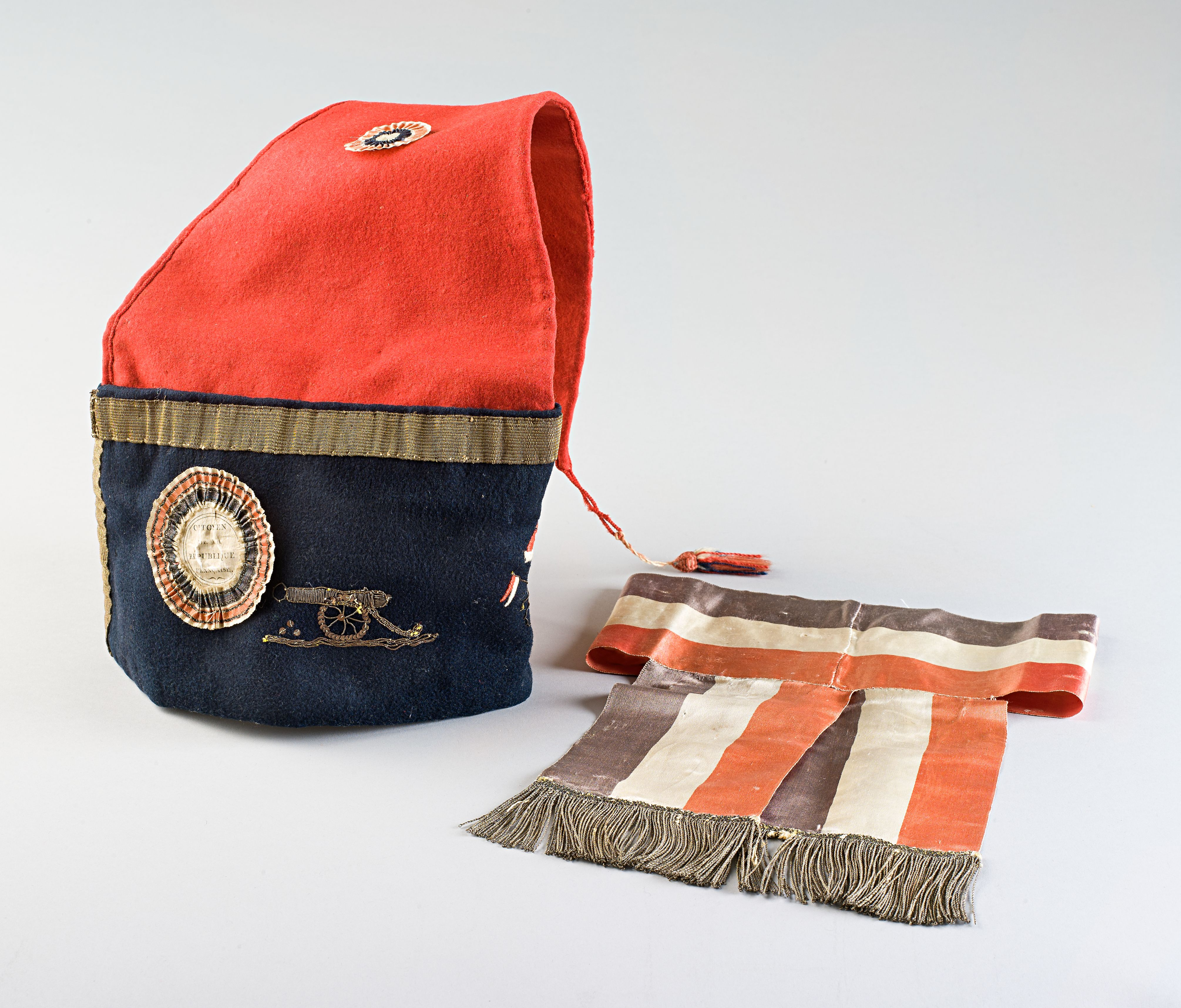
Hat and sash in the French colours worn by Sophie Dorothea Zinn, probably given to her by French guests in the Zinn House.

Sophie Dorothea Zinn was born into a wealthy merchant family in Copenhagen, the daughter of Johann Ludvig Zinn and his wife. She was a keen reader and was particularly struck by Jean-Jacques Rousseau's Confessions.

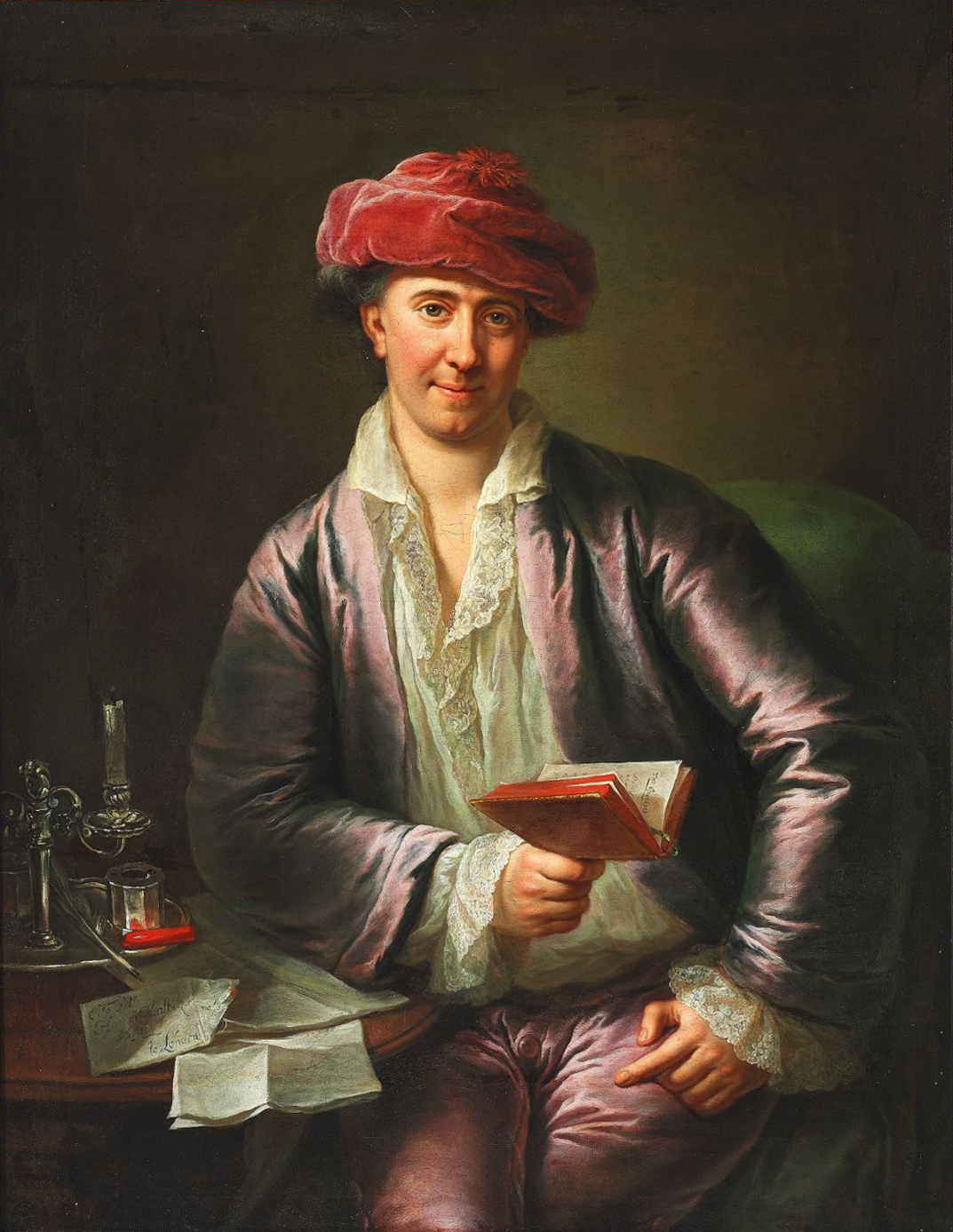
Henry Thalbitzer, Sophie's husband

One of her father's business partners, Hinrich Ladiges, a wealthy sugar manufacturer who was 40 years her senior, proposed to her when she was 17 years old. Her father was strongly in favour of the liaison but she declined. She later married Henry Thalbitzer (1767–1818) who was Royal Prussian consul to Helsingør. She was widowed in 1818.

== Grandma's Confessions ==
She wrote her memoirs after she became a widow at the age of 41. They were originally intended for their son Carl Wilhelm Thalbitzer (Billy) but later published under the name Grandmama's Bekiendelser. They offer a first-hand account of everyday life as a child and young woman in an upper-class environment in Copenhagen during the late 18th and early 19th century.
