= Hinrich Ladiges =

German-Danish sugar manufacturer

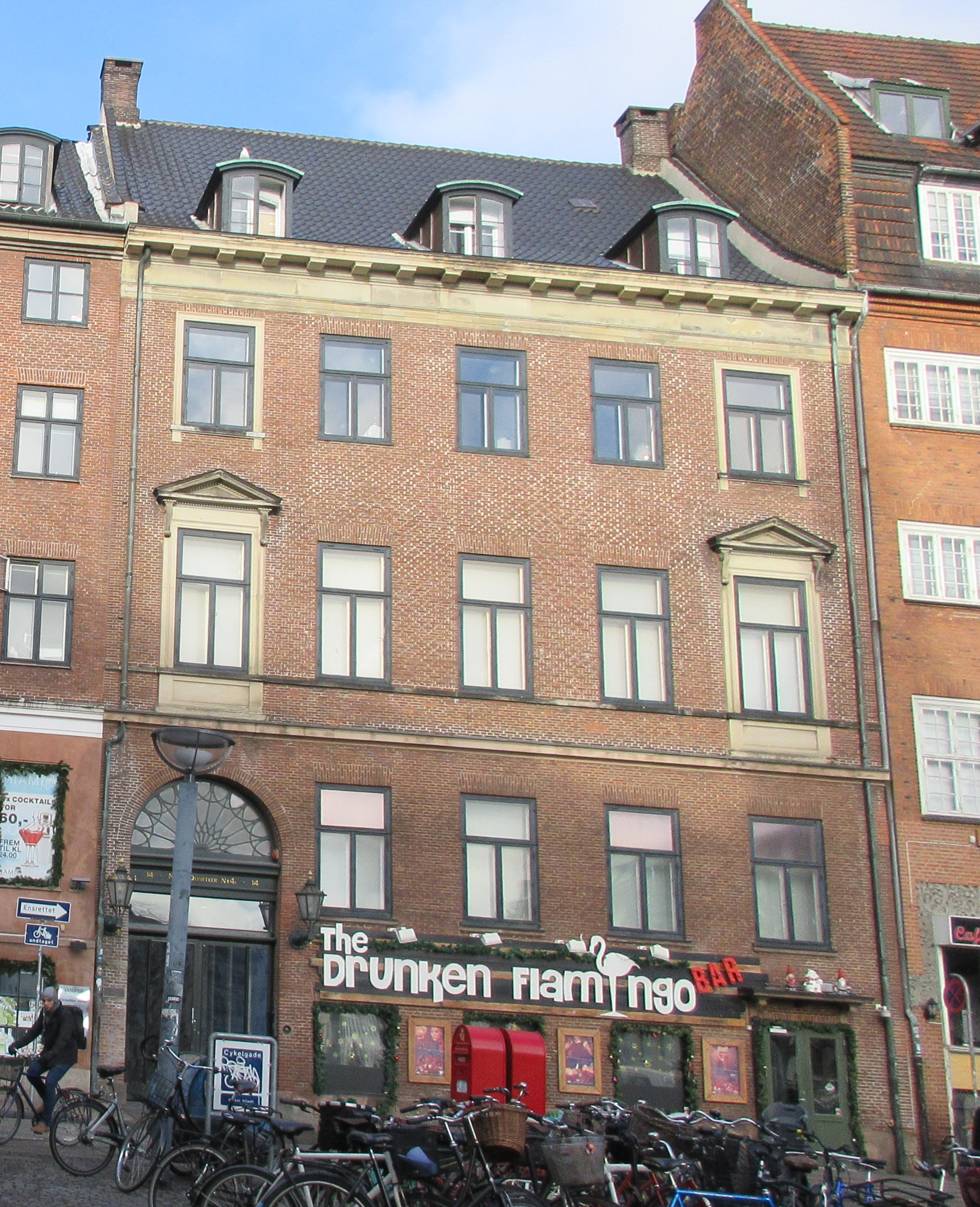
Ladiges' house a5 Gammeltorv 14 in Copenhagen

Hinrich Ladiges (14 January 1731 – 4 March 1805) was a German-Danish sugar manufacturer. He owned two sugar refineries in Copenhagen and died as one of the wealthiest men in the country. He died unmarried and left much of his estate to charity. His former home at Gammeltorv 14, now known as the Holm House after a later owner, was listed on the Danish registry for protected buildings and places in 1926.

== Biography ==
Ladiges was born in Altona. His parent were sugar-baker Ditmer L. (c. 1698–1764) and Margaretha Homann. He apprenticed as a sugar manufacturer at sugar refineries in Germany. In 1752, he was granted a monopoly on the establishment and operation of two sugar refineries in Aalborg and Viborg of which only the latter was built. In 1757 he was granted permission to move his sugar refinery to Copenhagen. In 1776 he opened a second sugar refinery. He became one of the wealthiest men in Denmark.

== Property ==
Ladiges owned the property at Gammeltorv 14 in Copenhagen. The building was listed on the Danish registry of protected buildings and places in 1926. Ladiges was from 1767 also the owner of a country house on Frederiksberg. The land stretched all the way from Allégade to present-day Edisonvej along the north side of Gammel Kongevej.

== Personal life ==
Ladiges never married. He proposed to Johann Ludvig Zinn's daughter Sophie Dorothea Zinn when she was 17 years old. Her father was strongly in favour of the liaison but she declined. On his death, he left an estate of 1½ mio. Danish rigsdaler of which Almindelig Hospital, Sankt Hans Hospital, Fødselsstiftelsen and the city's poorhouses (fattigvæsnet) each received approximately 200,000 rigsdaler.
