= Musikforeningen =

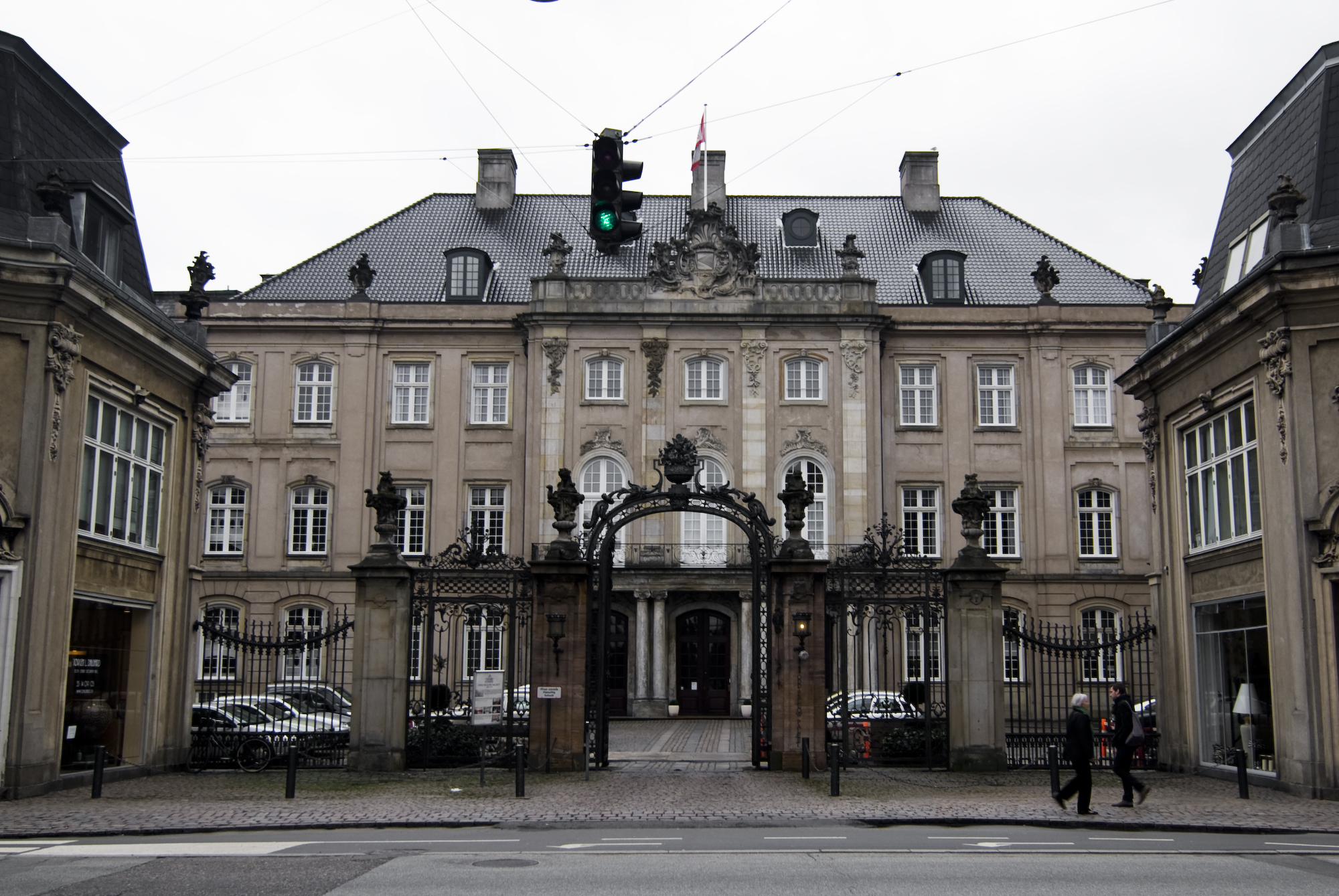
Odd Fellows Mansion in Copenhagen, Musikforeningen's venue for concerts

Musikforeningen (The Music Society) in Copenhagen was Denmark's most important concert venue in the 19th century. It operated from 1838 to 1931 but it was especially under the leadership of Niels Gade (1850–90) that it became a meeting place for the city's music life with its own symphony orchestra and choir. Carl Nielsen was director from 1915–27. Other leaders included Franz Gläser, Emil Hartmann and Franz Neruda.

== History ==
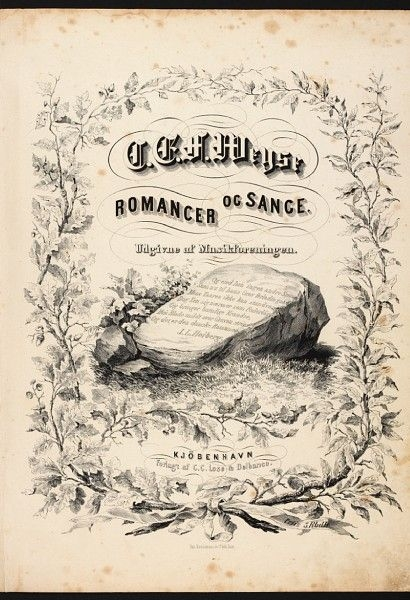
C.E.F. Weyse's Romancer og Sange published by Musikforeningen in 1853

Copenhagen's Musikforeningen was founded in 1836 by among others Johan Peter Emilius Hartmann and Edvard Collin. Its objective was to publish Danish musical works "for which failure to publish would represent a loss to art". In addition, the association was also to present awards and organise concerts. The mandate for putting on concerts soon became by far the most important function for the Society, making it the leading concert institution in Copenhagen. Johan Peter Emilius Hartmann was its chairman from 1839 to 1892, whilst Gade was a most effective leader of the orchestra and choir until his death in 1890. Gade was succeeded by J.P.E. Hartmann’ son, Emil Hartmann, who held the post for a year, but had to resign for health reasons. Franz Neruda then took over, conducting concerts until his death in 1915. During the early years, the association supported modern developments but even under Gade's leadership policy became more conservative. Under Neruda, the repertoire widened somewhat but still varied little from the classical repertoire of Vienna.

In the late 19th and early 20th century, the Copenhagen music scene developed rapidly. The Music Society, once the only institution to present orchestral concerts in the winter season, suddenly faced competition from many other organisations such as Koncertforeningen (1874-93), the Royal Orchestra (from 1883), the so-called Palæ concerts at Odd Fellows Mansion (1895-1931) and the Dansk Koncert-Forening (Danish Concert Association) (1901-40). It was therefore more thanks to its name than to its success that the Music Society maintained its status as the city's leading concert provider well into the 20th century. As a private association, it was totally dependent on its members, but as opportunities for concerts increased elsewhere, membership fell steadily. At the height of Gade's term, there had been as many as 2,500 members and each concert was presented twice. By the 1913–14 season, membership had fallen to 900 and concerts were only performed once.

== Structure of the organisation ==
As the Music Society was a private organisation, its concerts were also considered private events although the press were admitted. Financing consisted of membership dues, an annual State subsidy and the receipts of additional concerts open to the public. The Society had an unpaid amateur choir which took part in all its concerts. The orchestra, engaged specially for each concert, consisted of members of the Tivoli Orchestra.

There were usually three or four concerts each season which stretched from November to April. From time to time, there were additional concerts open to the paying public. Performances were held at 8 pm on Thursday evenings at Odd Fellows Mansion (often simply called the Palæ) in Copenhagen's Bredgade. Rehearsals were on Sunday afternoons, a convenient time for members of the choir.

== Carl Nielsen's chairmanship ==
Following Neruda's death, Carl Nielsen took over the management of the Music Society's concerts in 1915. There had already been talk of abolishing the association which had been in a state of steady decline ever since the great days of Niels Gade. But Nielsen managed to revive interest, reorganising the choir and somewhat modernising the rather conservative repertoire. He started to include works by contemporary Nordic composers such as Wilhelm Stenhammar, Kurt Atterberg and Louis Glass and contemporary French music by Claude Debussy, Maurice Ravel and Darius Milhaud). Late German romantic composers such as Gustav Mahler and Richard Strauss were not included.

Around 1922, interest drastically declined, not just as a result of the economic recession but especially because the Music Society was increasingly seen as an outdated institution. Poor reviews, triggered perhaps by his lack of professional experience as a conductor, led Nielsen to leave in 1927. He was succeeded by Ebbe Hamerik who, despite considerable experience, was unable to prevent the Music Society's closure in 1931.
