= Andreas Peter Berggreen =

Danish composer, organist and pedagogue

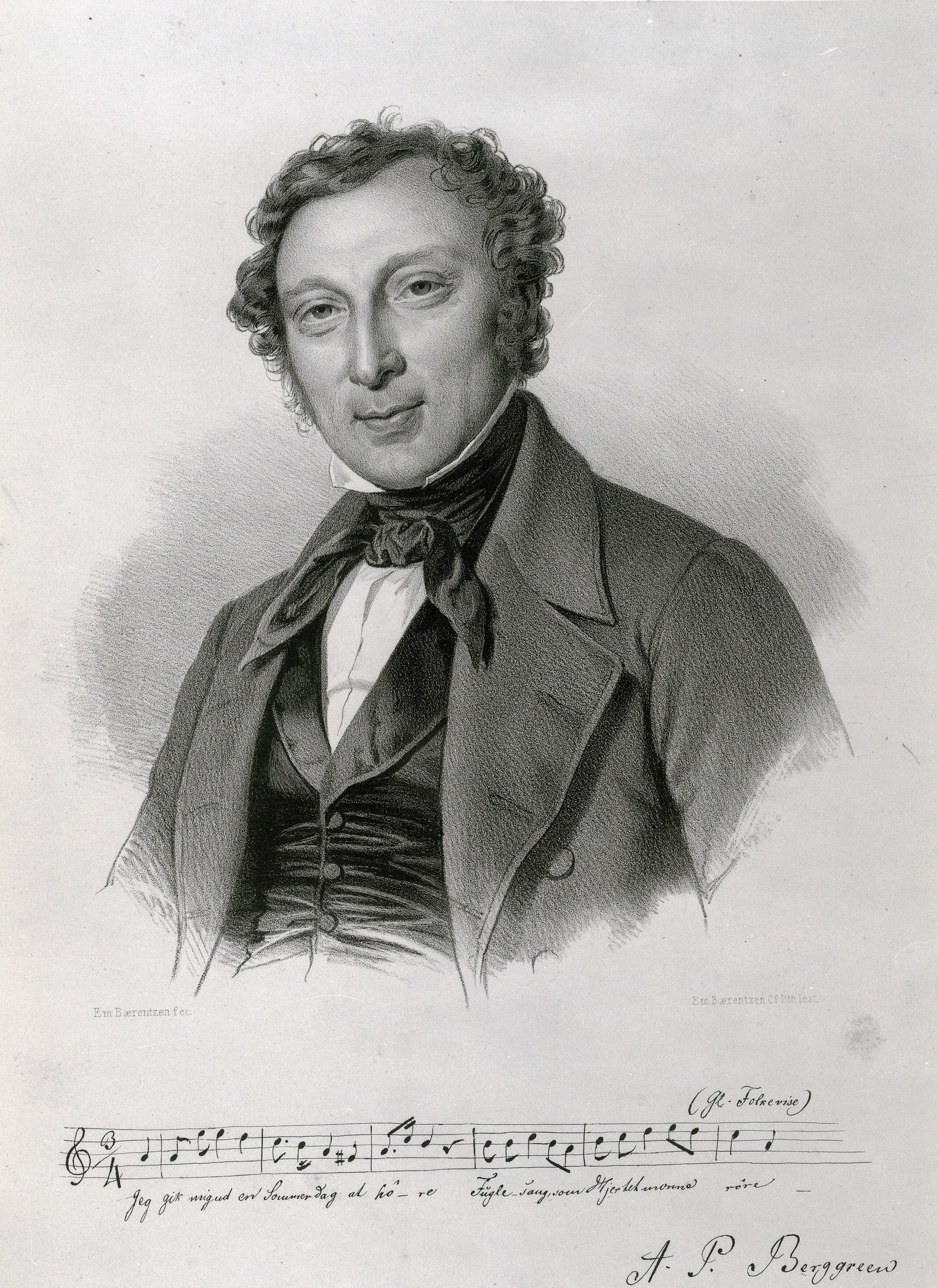
Andreas Peter Berggreen.

Andreas Peter Berggreen (March 2, 1801 – November 8, 1880) was a Danish composer, organist, and pedagogue.

Berggreen was born and died in Copenhagen. As a child Peter began composing songs and melodies for the flute. He initially studied law before pursuing a career in music, studying under Christopher Ernst Friedrich Weyse. In addition to Weyse, Berggreen was also heavily influenced by the German musician Johann Abraham Peter Schulz.

Berggreen was the organist at Trinitatis Church in Copenhagen from 1838 and taught singing at Metropolitanskolen from 1843. In 1859 he was appointed a song inspector by the Danish government.

Apart from several pieces of incidental music, a cantata, solo piano works, and songs, he published the folk song collections Melodier til Salmebog (1853) and Folk Sange og Melodier (1842–71). The latter comprises eleven large volumes, and includes folk songs in Norwegian, Danish, Swedish, German, English, French and Italian. Volume 8 (1868) features Slavic folk music in four sections: Russian; Polish; Bohemian and Moravian; and Sorbian.

== Musical compositions ==
Du, som vejen er og livet
Music by A.P. Berggreen, text by Christian Richardt, performed by Erik Damskier (0:30)

En liden stund
Music by A.P. Berggreen, text by N.F.S. Grundtvig, performed by Erik Damskier (0:24)

Et barn er født i Betlehem
Based on music from 17th century and text from 13th century (both written anonymously), this version of music presumably by A. P. Berggreen, text by N.F.S. Grundtvig, performed by Erik Damskier (0:24)

Guds menighed, syng for vor skaber
Music by A.P. Berggreen, text by N.F.S. Grundtvig, performed by Erik Damskier (0:26)

Her vil ties, her vil bies
Music by A.P. Berggreen, text by Hans Adolph Brorson, performed by Erik Damskier (0:35)

- Songs with Accompaniment of Guitar (1823)
- Cantata for Rege's Tohundredaarsfest (1823)
- Cantata for Prince Ferdinand and Princess Caroline Formælingsfest (1829)
- The picture and bust (opera in 1832)
- Socrates (1835 play)
- Tordenskiold (1832 play)
- Queen Margrethe (1833 play)
- "Songs for school"
- Several church compositions
- romances and songs
- hymns
