= Carl Hartmann (sculptor) =

Danish sculptor

Carl Christian Ernst Hartmann
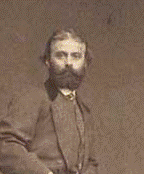
- Born: September 13, 1837
- Died: September 6, 1901 (aged 63)
- Parents: Johan Peter Emilius Hartmann (father); Emma Hartmann (mother)

Carl Christian Ernst Hartmann (13 September 1837 – 6 September 1901) was a Danish sculptor who worked with antique motifs in the Thorvaldsen tradition.

The son of composer Johan Peter Emilius Hartmann and his composer wife Emma Hartmann, née Zinn, Hartmann was born in Copenhagen. After training with August Saabye and Herman Wilhelm Bissen, he attended the Royal Danish Academy of Fine Arts from 1855, receiving the silver medal in 1859. He worked mainly with bronze rather than the more common marble. While in Rome in 1863, he created a colossal statue of Alexandros. In the 1870s, he joined the Johannes Group in connection with Vor Frue Kirke in Copenhagen. For a time, he was cultural correspondent for Nationaltidende.

Being highly musical, he also occasionally composed. A song of his, Mismod, sent anonymously to a jury consisting of Edvard Grieg and C.F.E. Horneman was selected by it for publication in 1870 in Nordiske Musikblade.
