= August Wilhelm Hartmann =

Danish composer (1775–1850)

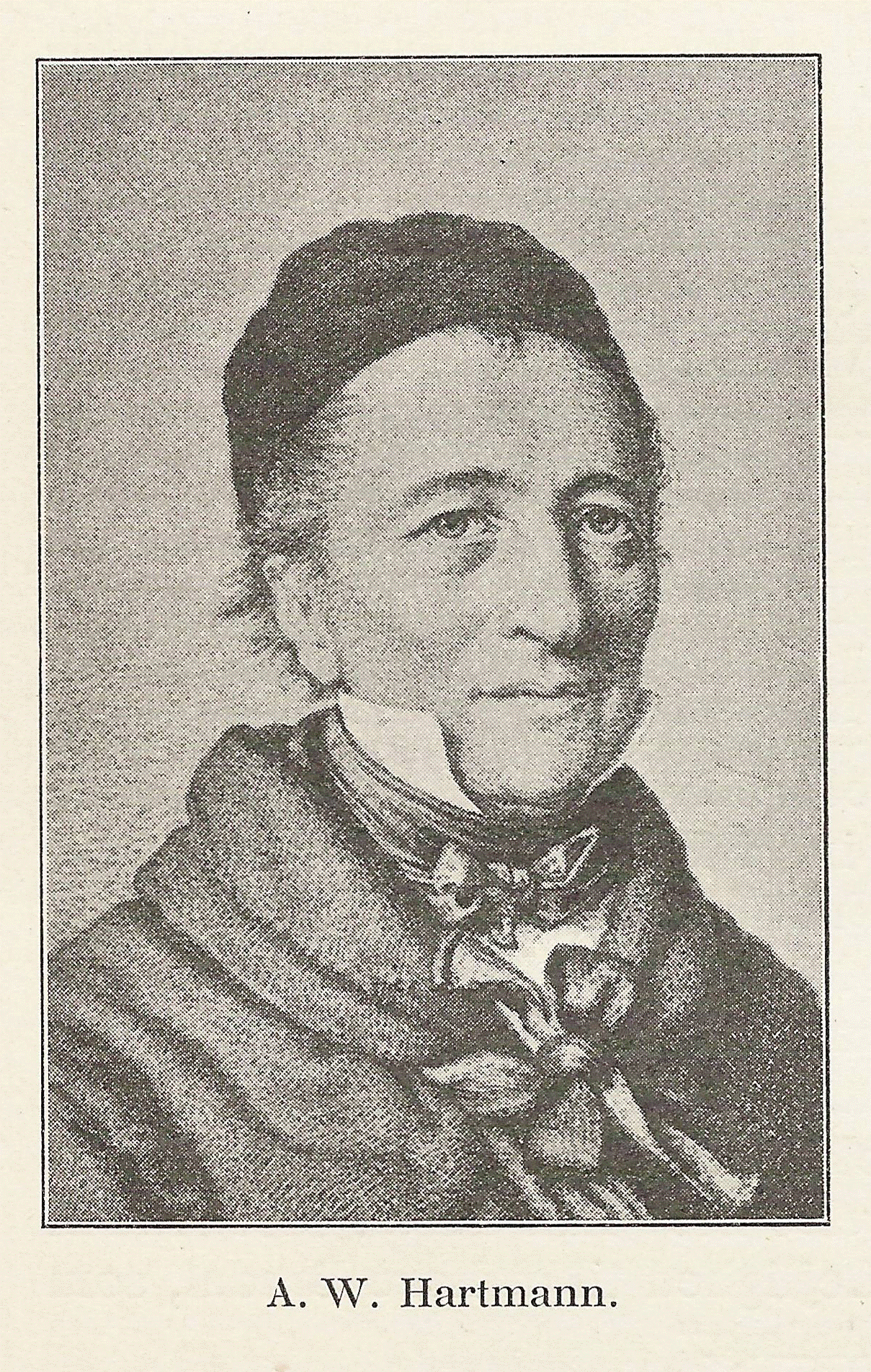
A picture of August Wilhelm Hartmann

August Wilhelm Hartmann (6 November 1775 – 15 November 1850) was a Danish classical composer and first violinist at the Royal Chapel in Copenhagen. He was a second generation of composers in the Hartmann musical family. Trained as a musician by his father, composer Johann Hartmann (1726–1793) and by composer Claus Schall (1757–1835), he has written various pieces for the piano. Reference can be made among others to a C minor piano sonata (ca. 1814–15) and to three sets of themes and variations for piano published by Lose in 1815.

He was himself the father of composer Johan Peter Emilius Hartmann (1805–1900). After having been first violinist at the Royal Chapel from 1796 to 1817, August Wilhelm Hartmann became organist at the Garrison church in Copenhagen, but had to retire in 1824 because of an increasing deafness, whereupon his son became his successor.

August Wilhelm Hartmann’s wife Christiane Petrea Friderica Wittendorf (1778–1848) was herself the daughter and granddaughter of organists. She became the governess of later King Frederik VII, and her son Johan Peter Emilius thus became playmate of the later king who was only two years younger than him.

When August Wilhelm Hartmann died on 15 November 1850, the poet Hans Christian Andersen wrote a poetry for his funeral, set in music by Johan Peter Emilius Hartmann. The latter also wrote the motet Quando Corpus Morietur to the memory of his father.

Hans Christian Andersen has described August Wilhelm Hartmann and his wife in his tale «The old tombstone». The painter Frederik Vermehren has left portraits of August Wilhelm and his wife.
