= Mainbernheim =

- Town
- Coat of arms

- Location of Mainbernheim within Kitzingen district
- Interactive map of Mainbernheim
- Location within Germany Location within Bavaria
- Coordinates: 49°42′N 10°13′E
- Country: Germany
- State: Bavaria
- Admin. region: Unterfranken
- District: Kitzingen

Government
  - Mayor (2020–26): Peter Kraus (FW)

Area
  - Total: 12.21 km^{2} (4.71 sq mi)
- Elevation: 226 m (741 ft)

Population (2025-12-31)
  - Total: 2,215
  - Density: 181.4/km^{2} (469.8/sq mi)
- Time zone: UTC+01:00 (CET)
  - Summer (DST): UTC+02:00 (CEST)
- Postal codes: 97350
- Dialling codes: 09323
- Vehicle registration: KT
- Website: www.mainbernheim.de

Mainbernheim (German pronunciation: [maɪnˈbɛʁnhaɪm]) is a municipality in Bavaria, Germany,4 kilometers to the south of Kitzingen (Landkreis, district of Kitzingen) in the direction of Nürnberg. It was first recorded in the chronicles of 889, during the reign of King Arnulf, the church being recognized by the influential bishopric of nearby Würzburg. The town was the site of a tariff house of the dukes of Ansbach and in thrall until 1397 to the duchy in the south, during the reign of King Wenceslaus. Mainbernheim was granted full rights as a city, although taxation privileges for Ansbach were extended until 1795.

Mainbernheim Kirch- und Rathausplatz

Today, Mainbernheim has a population of approximately 2200, the town having grown significantly due to new developments outside the city walls. The gummi-bear factory, Bären Schmidt, is the major industry there. Some extant points of interest include the 400-year-old farmhouses along Herrnstraße, which transverses the city from gate to gate and hosts several historic hotels and restaurants. Also along the main street are the Rathaus (city hall, 1548) and the adjacent Lutheran parish church, built on the foundations of an earlier cathedral (1498) after the Protestant Reformation (1750–1778). Just outside the main gate is the cemetery and arcade, dating from 1546 and containing fine examples of funerary flourishes. Off the main street, there is a recessed portal, which served as a hiding place for the Jews during the purges of World War II. The appearance of the inner city is little changed since Renaissance times.
