= Christian Richardt =

Danish writer

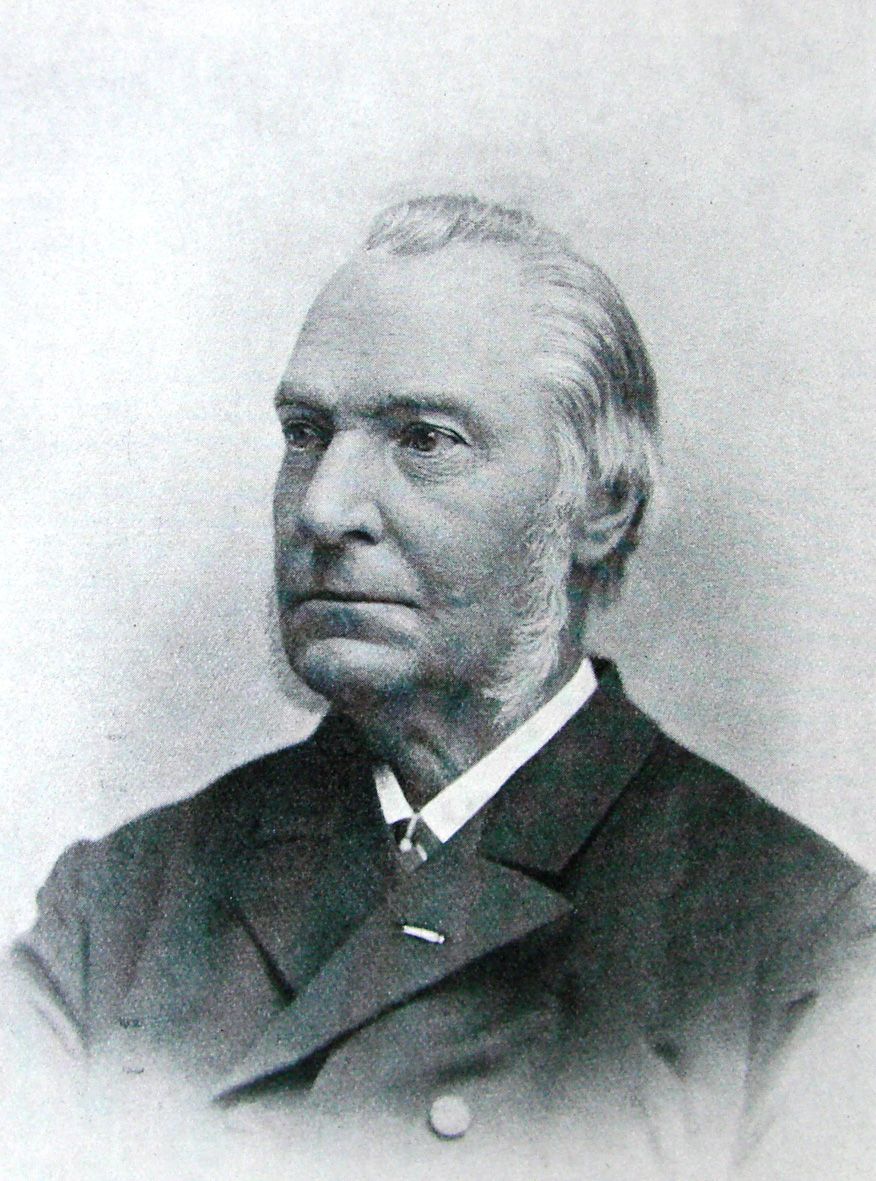
Christian Richardt

Christian Richardt (25 May 1831 in Copenhagen – 18 December 1892) was a Danish writer. He wrote the libretto for the opera Drot og marsk by Peter Heise.

== Sources ==
The following sources were given:

- Digte m.m. i Kalliope
- Biografi på Arkiv for dansk litteratur
- Danske Stormænd fra de seneste aarhundreder af L F La Cour og Knud Fabricius, 1912
