= Niels Gade =

Danish composer, conductor, and music teacher (1817–1890)

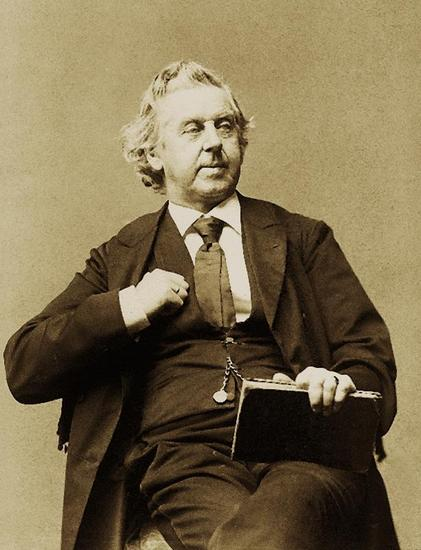
Niels Gade

Niels Wilhelm Gade (22 February 1817 – 21 December 1890) was a Danish composer, conductor, violinist, organist and teacher. Together with Johan Peter Emilius Hartmann, he was the leading Danish musician of his day, in the period known as the Danish Golden Age.

== Biography ==
Gade was born in Copenhagen, the son of a joiner and instrument maker. He was intended for his father's trade, but his passion for a musician's career, made evident by the ease and skill with which he learned to play upon a number of instruments, was not to be denied. Though he became proficient on the violin under Frederik Wexschall, and in the elements of theory under Christoph Weyse and Weyse's pupil Andreas Berggreen, he was to a great extent self-taught.

He began his professional career as a violinist with the Royal Danish Orchestra, which premiered his concert overture Efterklange af Ossian ("Echoes of Ossian") in 1841. When the performance of his first symphony had to be delayed in Copenhagen, it was sent to Felix Mendelssohn. Mendelssohn received the work positively, writing 'I can’t remember when another work made a more lively, beautiful impression on me'. He conducted it in Leipzig in March 1843, to enthusiastic public reaction. His work attracted the notice of the king, who gave the composer a Danish government fellowship which enabled him to go to Leipzig and Italy. Moving to Leipzig, Gade taught at the Conservatory there, working as an assistant conductor of the Gewandhaus Orchestra, and befriending Mendelssohn, who had an important influence on his music.

In 1845 Gade conducted the premiere of Mendelssohn's Violin Concerto in E minor with Ferdinand David at the violin. He also became friends with Robert Schumann and Robert Franz. Robert Schumann wrote a long enthusiastic article describing Gade as an exceptional young musician having the looks of Mozart and the four letters of whose name were those of the four strings of the violin. In his correspondence he talks of Gade as a rare talent with whom he sympathises as only with few. One of Schumann's piano pieces is entitled "Gade" and based on the notes G-A-D-E, and Schumann's third piano trio is dedicated to Gade. Gade conducted the first performance of Schumann's piano Concerto with Clara Schumann at the piano.

At Mendelssohn's death in 1847, Gade was appointed to his position as chief conductor in Leipzig but was forced to return to Copenhagen in the spring of 1848 when war broke out between Prussia and Denmark. In Copenhagen Gade became acquainted with the composer Cornelius Gurlitt and they remained friends until Gade's death. Gade became director of the Copenhagen Musical Society (Musikforeningen), a post he retained until his death. He established a new orchestra and chorus, while settling into a career as Denmark's most prominent musician. Under his direction, the Music Society reached its peak. He also worked as an organist; though he lost the prestigious position of organist at Our Lady, today's Copenhagen Cathedral, to Johan Peter Emilius Hartmann, he served in the Holmen Church in Copenhagen from 1850 until his death. Gade was joint director of the Copenhagen Conservatory with Hartmann (whose daughter he married in 1852) and Holger Simon Paulli, became court conductor in 1861, and was pensioned by the government in 1876. An important influence on a number of Scandinavian composers, he encouraged and taught Edvard Grieg, Carl Nielsen, Louis Glass, Elfrida Andrée, Otto Malling, August Winding and Asger Hamerik.

Among Gade's works are eight symphonies, a violin concerto, chamber music, organ and piano pieces and a number of large-scale cantatas, Comala (1846) and Elverskud (1853) among them, which he called "concert pieces" (koncertstykker). These products, embraced post-1848 as works of Romantic nationalism, are sometimes based on Danish folklore. Apparently Gade never rated "The Bridal Waltz" (Brudevalsen). It was rescued by August Bournonville in his ballet A Folk Tale (Et folkesagn) and became an essential part of Danish weddings.

== Personal life ==
On 27 April 1852 Gade married Emma Sophie Amalie Hartmann, daughter of Johan Peter Emilius Hartmann. He dedicated his Spring Fantasy to her to celebrate their engagement and his 5th Symphony with piano concertante as a wedding gift. In 1855, she died in childbirth while delivering twins; only one of them, Johan Felix Gade (1855-1928), survived. He became the father of organist and composer Niels Rudolph Gade.

Niels Gade remarried in 1857 to Mathilde Stæger, herself an outstanding pianist. For the wedding he wrote Fruehlingsbotschaft expressing both his love for his now deceased first wife and the start of a new life and love for his second wife. This new marriage brought him two more children – a son, Axel Wilhelm Gade (1860-1921), who himself became a noted violinist, composer and conductor, and a daughter, Dagmar Gade (1863-1952). Niels Gade died in Copenhagen in the Christmas days of 1890.

There is no family connection with the composer Jacob Gade.

A selection of Gade's correspondence with European contemporaries was published by Inger Sørensen as Niels W. Gade og hans europæiske kreds - En brevveksling 1836–1891.

== See also ==
- Statue of Niels W. Gade
