= Johan Peter Emilius Hartmann =

Danish composer (1805–1900)

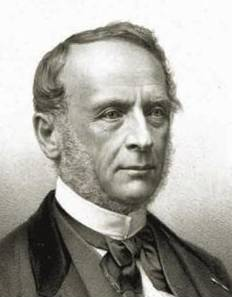
Johan Peter Emilius Hartmann

Johan Peter Emilius Hartmann (14 May 1805 – 10 March 1900) was, together with his son-in-law Niels W. Gade, a leading Danish composer of the 19th century, a period known as the Danish Golden Age. According to Alfred Einstein, he was "the real founder of the Romantic movement in Denmark and even in all Scandinavia". J.P.E. Hartmann was the third generation of composers in the Danish musical Hartmann family.

== Biography ==
Johan Peter Emilius Hartmann was born and died in Copenhagen, Denmark. He was the son of composer August Wilhelm Hartmann (1775–1850) and Christiane Petrea Frederica Wittendorff (1778–1848), and the grandson of composer Johann Hartmann (1726-1793), who had originally emigrated to Denmark from Silesia. J.P.E. Hartmann himself was largely self-taught. Complying with his father's wishes (who wanted to protect him from the uncertainties of a musician's life), he studied the law and worked as a civil servant from 1829 to 1870, whilst pursuing an extensive musical career. By 1824, he became organist at the Garnisons Kirke in Copenhagen and, in 1832, made a first major impression on audiences with the opera Ravnen. The opera received a long and positive review from Robert Schumann. The libretto was by Hartmann's lifelong friend Hans Christian Andersen, with whom he later cooperated on numerous other works, cantatas, songs, incidental music or operas. Andersen among others also wrote the libretto for Hartmann’ popular opera Liden Kirsten, a Danish pendant to the Bartered Bride, which was performed by Liszt in Weimar, and which remains today the most often played Danish opera. Hartmann also cooperated with other important Danish writers of his time, such as Henrik Hertz on his opera Korsarerne or with Adam Øhlenschlæger, writing incidental music and overtures to several of his plays, as well as music in the form of both songs and also melodramas for some of his poems (e.g. Guldhornene), and cooperating in writing numerous cantatas.

In 1836, Hartmann made a study tour to Germany and France, where he made the acquaintance of Frédéric Chopin, Gioachino Rossini, Luigi Cherubini, Gaspare Spontini and Louis Spohr. In his early musical life, Spohr and the Danish composer Christoph Ernst Friedrich Weyse were Hartmann's early mentors, as well as Heinrich Marschner. Further journeys to Germany followed in the next few years, during which he met Mendelssohn, Schumann, Liszt, Brahms and other composers of the time. He also founded the Copenhagen Music Society (Musikforeningen) in 1836, remaining its chairman until the end of his life. In 1843, he transferred from Garnisons Kirke to play the organ for Copenhagen's cathedral, the Vor Frue Kirke, and became the director of the Student Choral Association. He held both these posts until his death. His gentle character made him popular, his compatriots organising year on year numerous impressive feasts to celebrate his birthday.

In 1867, after having taught several subjects at the Danish Academy of Music which originally was founded in 1825 by Giuseppe Siboni (1780–1839), Hartmann helped co-establish and also direct the Royal Danish Academy of Music (Københavns Musikkonservatorium) with Niels Gade (1817–1890) and Holger Simon Paulli (1810–1891).

== Personal life ==
In 1829, he married Emma Sophie Amalie Zinn (1807–1851), herself a composer. One of their sons, Emil Hartmann (1836–1898) also became a renowned composer, while their son Carl Christian Ernst Hartmann (1837–1901) became a sculptor. Two of their daughters married composers; Emma Sophie (b. 1831) married Niels Gade and Clara (b. 1839) married August Winding (1835–1899). Many important later Danish artists, such as the composer Niels Viggo Bentzon and the director Lars von Trier descend from Hartmann.

== Style ==
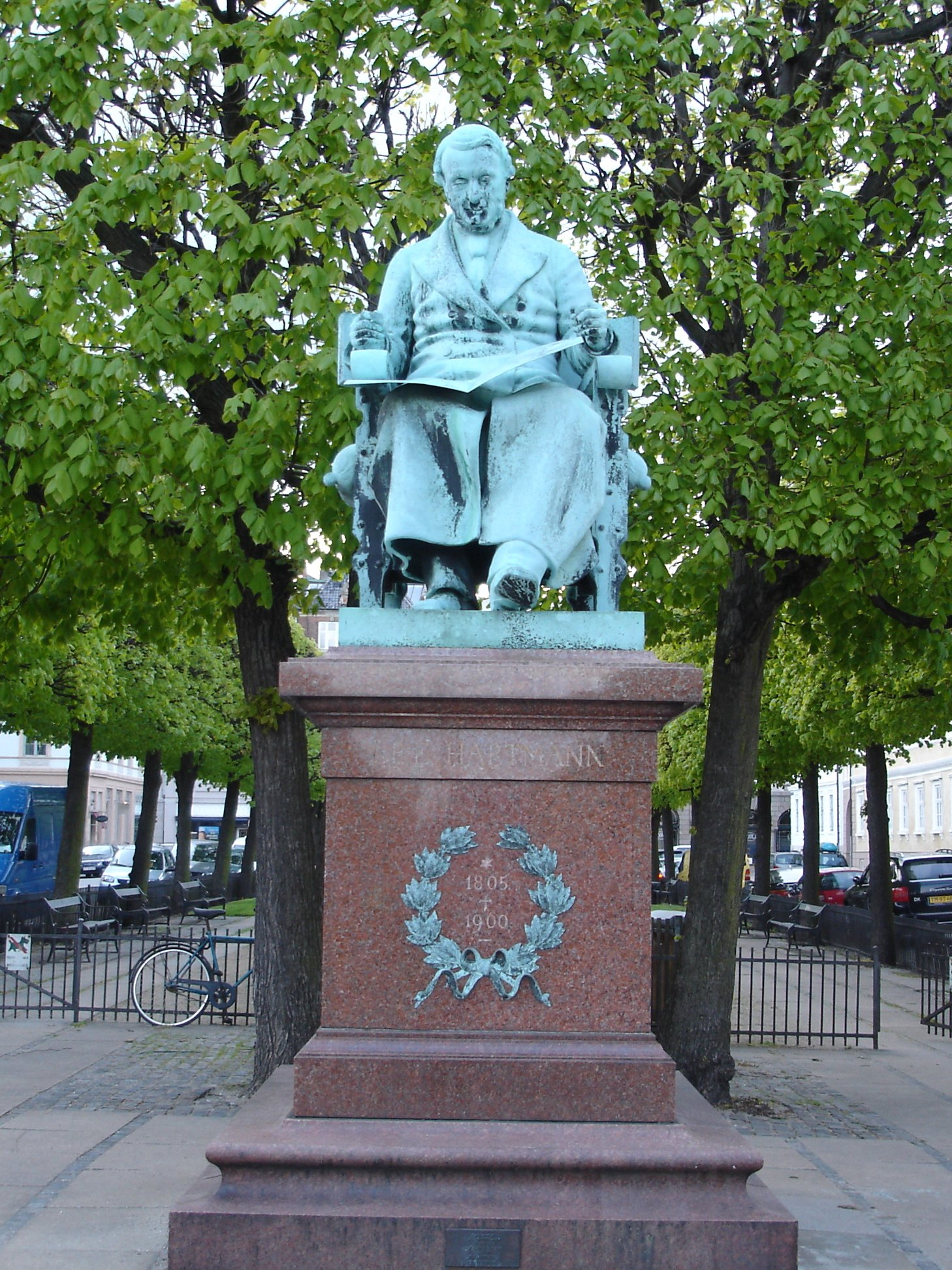
J. P. E. Hartmann by August Saabye 1905, Sankt Annæ Plads, Copenhagen

Hartmann's works are characterized by artistic seriousness, dramatic vitality, and in particular, by national coloring. The Nordic elements, which can be discerned in the themes based on folksongs, modulations, and the tendency towards rather dark sounds, emerged strongly after the 1830s. Hartmann united these Romantic influences with a strong control over both form and theme, acquired through his Classical training.

Hartmann's life covered the whole 19th century and his very varied output makes it difficult to slot him in one category. His early works, such as a Flute Sonata or a Piano Quartet were still written in Beethoven's lifetime and are naturally in the style of the Viennese classicist period. Influences from the then prevailing German models - Weber, Spohr or Marschner - can also be detected. Much of his later work belongs to the generation of Robert Schumann or Felix Mendelssohn. Still his style continued developing over the years. Later compositions, such as the monumental A-Minor piano sonata or some Overtures (Yrsa) bear some similarities with Brahms. And there are pre-modernist accents in many of his latest pieces pointing notably to Carl Nielsen. His work had a strong influence on Scandinavian composers of later generations such as Edvard Grieg, Peter Erasmus Lange-Mueller or Carl Nielsen. Edvard Grieg wrote in an article in Musikbladet in 1885 how important a composer Hartmann was not only for Denmark but for all composers of Nordic countries: »What composer in Scandinavia with genuine feeling for Scandinavia does not remember today what he owes to Hartmann ! The best, the most profound thoughts that a whole posterity of more or less consequential spirits has lived on have been first expressed by him, have been made to resound in us by him ».

In his old age, Hartmann’s increasing originality gave him the nickname of being the «old man prodigy» («Vidunderolding»). Overall, his music displays great diversity, going from humour and poetry to drama and tragedy.

== Works ==
=== Orchestral ===
- Symphony No. 1 in G minor, Op. 17 (1835)
- Symphony No. 2 in E, Op. 48 (1847–48)
- Twelve Overtures
  - Concert overture, Op. 3 (1825)
  - Sacred overture, Op. 9 (1827)
  - Ravnen, Op. 12 (1830–32)
  - Korsarerne, Op. 16 (1832–35)
  - Hakon Jarl, Op. 40 (1844)
  - Liden Kirsten, Op. 44 (1844–46)
  - Concert overture, Op. 51 (1852)
  - Axel og Valborg, Op. 57 (1856)
  - Correggio, Op. 59 (1858)
  - En Efteraarsjagt, Op. 63 (1864, dedicated to Niels W. Gade)
  - Yrsa, Op. 78 (1883)
  - Dante, Op. 85 (1888)
- Incidental music
  - Olaf den Hellige, Op. 23 (1838) (Adam Oehlenschläger)
  - Knud den Store, Op. 28 (1839) (Adam Oehlenschläger)
  - Fiskeren of hans Børn, Op. 29 (1840) (Adam Oehlenschläger)
  - Syvsoverdag, Op. 30 (12840 - revised in 1872) (Johan Ludvig Heiberg)
  - Maurerpigen, Op. 32 (1840) (Hans Christian Andersen)
  - Undine, Op. 33 (1842) (Carl Borgaard)
  - Hakon Jarl, Op. 40 (1844–57) (Oehlenschläger)
  - En Ødeland (1849) (Ferdinand Raimund)
  - En Episode (1852) (Chr. Juul)
  - Kildereise (1858) (Intermezzo by Hans Christian Andersen for the play by Ludvig Holberg)
  - Ambrosius (1878) (Christian Knud Frederik Molbech)
  - Yrsa, Op. 78 (1881–82) (Adam Oehlenschläger)
  - Dante, Op. 85 (1888) (Christian Knud Frederik Molbech)
- Melodrama
  - Guldhornene (The Golden Horns), Op. 11 (1832, Adam Oehlenschläger)
  - Jurabjerget, Op. 14 (1833, Adam Oehlenschläger)
  - Der Taucher, Op. 21 (1837, Friedrich Schiller)
  - Prologue for the celebration of the Musikforening in the memory of Niels W. Gade (1891, on a poetry by Christian Richardt)
- Ballets (all to choreography by August Bournonville)
  - Fantasiens Ø (Fantasy Island, First Act) (1838)
  - Valkyrien, (The Valkyrie), Op. 62 (1860–61)
  - Thrymskviden (The Song of Thrym), Op. 67 (1867–68)
  - Arcona, Op. 72 (1873–75)
  - Et Folkesagn, together with Niels W. Gade
- Other
  - Three Character pieces for string orchestra, Op. 81
  - Multiple marches and other pieces of circumstance

=== Vocal ===
- Operas
  - Ravnen, Op. 12 (1830–32) (Hans Christian Andersen)
  - Korsarerne, (The Corsair), Op. 16 (1832–35) (Henrik Hertz)
  - Liden Kirsten, (Little Kirsten), Op. 44 (1844–46) (Hans Christian Andersen)
  - Saul (unfinished) (1864–65) (Hans Christian Andersen)
- Concert cantatas
  - Den musikelskende Landsbypige (1833) (Adam Oehlenschläger)
  - De tvende Dugdraaber (1844) (Schack von Staffelt)
  - Den sørgende Jødinde (1844-1875) (Hans Christian Andersen)
  - Hilsen til Frænderne (1848) (B.S. Ingemann)
  - Fragment af Oehlenschlägers 'Jesu Bjergprædiken' ", Op. 49 (1848)
  - En Sommerdag (A Summer's Day, 1854) (Henrik Hertz)
  - Dryadens Bryllup, Op. 60 (1858) (Fr. Paludan-Müller)
  - Zigeunersang (1859) (Goethe, translated by H. C. Andersen)
  - Hinsides Bjergene (1865) (Andreas Munch)
  - I Provence, Op. 68 (1868–69) (Carl Andersen)
  - Hilsen til Norge (1869)
  - Foraarssang, Op. 70 (Spring Song, 1870–71) (H. C. Andersen)
  - Foran Sydens Kloster (1871) (Bjørnsterne Bjørnson)
  - Davids 115de Psalme (1871)
  - Vølvens Spaadom, Op. 71 (The Prophecy of the Volva, Poetic Edda)
  - Sabbats Stilhed, Op. 76 (1878–79) (Andreas Munch)
  - Bruden, Op. 77(4) (1880) (Emil Aarestrup)
  - Luther i Wartburg, Op. 79 (1884) (Johan Ludvig Heiberg)
  - Tonernes Verden, Op. 82 (1885) (Christian Richardt)
  - Hellig Tre Kongers Kvad (1893)
  - Numerous other choral songs with instrumental accompaniment
- Church cantatas and cantatas for special occasions
  - Som livet svinder (1820)
  - New Year's Eve cantata (1824-1825)
  - Cantata for the Celebration of the Organ, Op. 5 (1825) (Adam Oehlenschläger)
  - Motet for the feast of the Jubilee (1826)
  - Motet for Christmas Feast (1827)
  - Himmelske Lyd (1828) (Adam Oehlenschläger)
  - Easter Cantata (1828)
  - Christian, som elsker de yndige Muser (1831)
  - Song for the Birthday of Prince Christian (1832)
  - Paa Grændsen mellem Land og Stad (1834)
  - Song for the Birthday of Prince Christian (1835)
  - Kantate til Efterslægtselskabet, Op. 19 (1836) (Adam Oehlenschläger)
  - Cantata for the Birthday of Princess Amalia (1839)
  - Cantata in the Memory of A.W. Hauch (1838) (Adam Oehlenschläger)
  - Funeral Cantata for His Majesty King Frederik VI, Op. 27 (1839–40) (H.C. Andersen)
  - Funeral Cantata for Giuseppe Siboni (1839) (H.C. Andersen)
  - Cantata for the Silver Wedding of King Christian VIII and Queen Caroline Amalia (1840)
  - Cantata for the Birthday of King Christian VIII (1841)
  - Cantata for the Birthday of Queen Caroline Amalia (1842) (H.C. Andersen)
  - Cantata in the memory of C.E.F. Weyse, Op. 36 (1842) (Henrik Hertz)
  - Cantata for the Jubilee of Professor Brorson (1843) (H.C. Andersen)
  - Cantata in the memory of Bertel Thorvaldsen, Op. 41 (1844) (Henrik Hertz)
  - Funeral Cantata for his Majesty King Christian VIII, Op. 47 (1848) (Johan Ludvig Heiberg)
  - Quando Corpus Morietur, Op. 15 (1850, for three Soloists, Chorus and Orchestra)
  - Mindesang over de Faldne: Slumrer Sødt i Slesvigs Jord, (1850, for Chorus and great Orchestra)
  - Cantata for the Wedding of Baron Bille-Brahe (1852) (H.C. Andersen)
  - Cantata for the Inauguration of the new Building for the Studentersangforeningen, Op. 64 (1863) (Christian Richardt)
  - Funeral Cantata for His Majesty King Frederik VII, Op. 64 b (1863) (H.P. Holst)
  - Cantata for the Inauguration of the new Building for Copenhagen University (1866) (Christian Richardt)
  - Cantata for the Wedding of Crown Prince Frederik and Princess Louisa (1869) (H.P. Holst)
  - Cantata in the memory of Orla Lehmann (1870) (Carl Ploug)
  - Cantata for the Inauguration of the new Royal Theatre (1874) (Carl Ploug)
  - Cantata for the Jubilee of Copenhagen University, Op. 75 (1878–79) (Carl Ploug)
  - Cantata for the Inauguration of the Henrik Smith School (1882) (Carl Andersen)
  - Cantata for the commemoration of Ludvig Holberg (1884) (Christian Richardt)
  - Cantata for the Jubilee of Borgerdydskolen (1887) (Christian Richardt)
  - Cantata for the Birthday of His Majesty King Christian IX (1888)
  - Cantata for the Inauguration of the new Concert Palace (1889)
  - Cantata for the Gold Wedding of King Christian IX (1891-982) (Christian Richardt)
  - Cantata for the Consecration of the Bishop of Copenhagen Cathedral (1899)
- Songs and Cantatas for a capella chorus
- Songs and romances for voice and piano
  - Sechs Gesänge, for voice and piano, Op. 13 (1832)
  - Fire Danske Sange, for voice and piano (among which the popular Flyv Fugl, flyv over Furesøens Vove, and Lille Cathrine) (1838)
  - Sechs Lieder, for voice and piano, Op. 35
  - Seks Sange af B.S. Ingemann, for voice and piano, Op. 45
  - Sulamith og Salomon, nine songs for alternated voices and piano, after B. S. Ingemann, Op. 52 (1847–48)
  - Sechs Gesänge, for voice and piano, Op. 55a (dedicated to Sophie Gade)
  - Folmer Spillemands Viser af Hjortens Flugt, cycle of melodies for voice and piano, Op. 56
  - Fem Sange, for voice and piano, Op. 63
  - Sange og Viser, songs for voice and piano, Op. 77
  - Solen i Siljedalen, cycle of melodies for voice and piano
  - Hundreds of individual songs and romances

=== Chamber music ===
- Sonata for Violin and Piano No. 1 in G minor, Op. 8 (1826)
- Sonata for Violin and Piano No. 2 in C, Op. 39 (1844)
- Sonata for Violin and Piano No. 3 in G minor, Op. 83 (1886)
- Suite for Violin and Piano in A minor, Op. 66 (1864)
- Fantasi-Allegro for Violin and Piano in D Major (1889)
- Sonata for Flute and Piano in B-flat Major, Op. 1 (1825)
- Andante and Variations for Piano Trio in C Major (1849)
- String Quartet in G Major (1848, last movement only half finished)
- String Quartet in A Major (1852, last movement only in sketches)
- Piano Quartet in F Major, Op. 2

=== Piano ===
- Piano Sonata No. 1 in D minor, Op. 34 (1841)
- Piano Sonata No. 2 in G minor (1851)
- Piano Sonata No. 3 in F (1853)
- Piano Sonata No. 4 in A minor, Op. 80 (1876–83)
- Piano Sonatina in G major, Op. 63a (1863)
- Sonatina for piano four hands, Op. 4 (1826)
- Two Rondos for piano, Op. 6 (1829)
- Fantasy for piano, Op. 7
- Allegro di Bravura and Andante for piano, Op. 10 (1829)
- Eight Caprices for piano, Op. 18 (1835, published in two collections dedicated respectively to Heinrich Marschner and Felix Mendelssohn)
- Two characteristic pieces for piano, Op. 25 (1839)
- Introduction and Andantino religioso for piano, Op. 26
- Three genre pieces for piano, Op. 26
- Eight sketches for piano, Op. 31 (1840–41, dedicated to Emma Hartmann)
- Six pieces in Song form for piano, Op. 37 (1842)
- Three pieces for piano (Ballo militare, Cantilena elegiaca, Allegro grazioso)
- Six character pieces for piano, Op. 50, with introductory poems by Hans Christian Andersen
- Three pieces for piano (Svensk Hjemvee, Capriccio, Andantino - Hun sidder derinde og spiller klaver) (1848–51)
- Instructive studies for piano, Op. 53 (1851°
- Fantasy pieces for piano, Op. 54, dedicated to Clara Schumann)
- Novelette in six small pieces for piano, Op. 55 (1852–55), with introductory poems by Hans Christian Andersen
- Four pieces for piano (Gudfa'er fortæller, Vikingefruens drøm, Tys!, Juletrøst)
- Nine studies and novelettes for piano, Op. 65
- Pieces from older and more recent times for piano, Op. 74 (dedicated to Emil Hartmann)
- Numerous other shorter pieces

=== Organ ===
- Fantasy in A major (1826)
- Fantasy in F minor, Op. 20 (published 1837)
- Funeral March for Thorvaldsen (1844) with brass ensemble, published in a solo organ version (1879) by Hartmann
- Funeral March for Oehlenschläger (1850), with brass ensemble
- Organ Sonata in G minor, Op. 58 (1855)
- Funeral March for Nicolai Peter Nielsen (1860)
- Opening Music for a University Anniversary (1879), with brass ensemble

== Other sources ==
- "Hartmann 3) Johann Peter Emilius" in Meyers Konversations-Lexikon, Leipzig and Vienna: Verlag des Bibliographischen Instituts, 1885–92, 4th ed., vol. 8, pp. 185–86. (in German)
- William Behrend, J.P.E. Hartmann: En Levnedskildring, Gyldendal, 1918, 93 pages
- Viggo Bitsch, J.P.E. Hartmann, Olsens Boghandel, 1954
- Lothar Brix, Die Klaviermusik von Johan Peter Emilius Hartmann: Ein Beitrag zur musikalischen Romantik in Skandinavien, Dissertation, Göttingen, 1971
- Dan Fog, Hartmann-Katalog: Fortegnelse over J.P.E. Hartmanns trykte Kompositioner, København, Dan Fog Musikforlag, 1991, 189 pages
- Angul Hammerich, J.P.E. Hartmann, Biografiske Essays, G.E. Gads forlag, 1916, 184 pages
- Richard Hove, J.P.E. Hartmann, København, Dansk Musiktidskrift, 1934, 172 pages
- Inger Soerensen, Hartmann, et Dansk komponistdynasti, Gyldendal, 656 pages
- Inger Soerensen, JPE Hartmann og Hans Kreds, 4 volumes, Museum Tusculanum Forlag, 1999-2002, 2452 pages
- Inger Soerensen, JPE Hartmann, Thematic-Bibliographic Catalogue of his Works, 2 volumes, Dansk Center for Musikudgivelse, 1019 pages
