= Liden Kirsten =

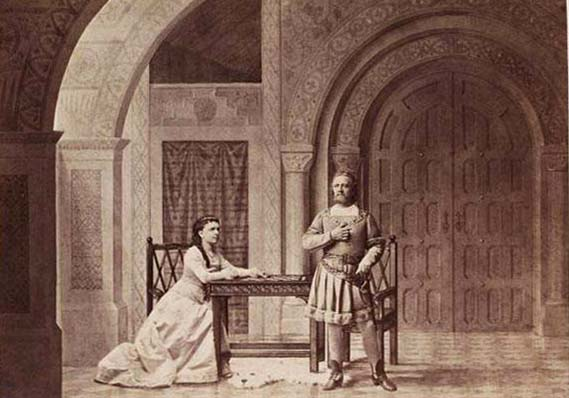
Sophie Keller and Julius Steenberg in a production of Liden Kirsten from c. 1880.

Liden Kirsten (transl. Little Kirsten), Op. 44, is an opera in two acts by Johan Peter Emilius Hartmann with a Danish libretto by Hans Christian Andersen. It premiered on 12 May 1846 at the Royal Danish Theatre in Copenhagen but was only a success after being reworked from one to two acts for the 1858–59 season.

== Background ==
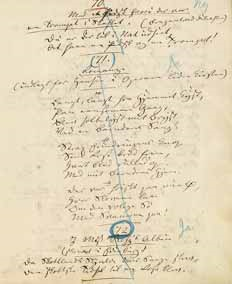
Andersen's manuscript for Liden Kirsten, Romance

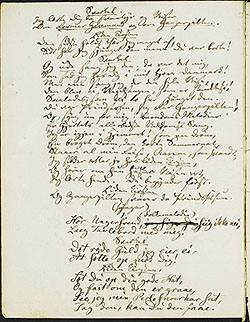
Andersen's manuscript for the "Tavlebordsduetten"

When Hans Christian Andersen came to Rome in 1833, he brought with him a collection of medieval Danish folk songs (folkeviser) of which especially Hr. Sverkel would inspire him to write a dramatic play. In January 1835 he had finally completed the libretto to a Singspiel entitled Liden Kirsten. Andersen handed the play over to the Royal Theatre and it was his intention that some of the songs should be performed to traditional folk melodies. It was criticized for suffering from "emptiness, thinness and dramatic poverty" but was all the same accepted. It was then handed over to the composer Ivar Bredal who was supposed to find and arrange the suitable folk melodies but never completed the work.

Around ten years later, Andersen searched for a subject for an opera for his friend J. P. E. Hartmann. From February through August–September 1844, he adapted Liden Kirsten into an opera in one act. He was then ready to show the result to Hartmann. It was in October handed over to the Royal Theatre where it was once again received with some skepticism. Johan Ludvig Heiberg commented that "there is no real plot but the situation is romantic and it has a certain poetic air about it which, accompanied by the music (if it is successful), may have a considerable appeal".

Hartmann began working on the music in the spring of 1845 but delayed its completion. In October, Hartmann explained to Andersen that he would like the Jenny Lind euphoria after her successful performances in Copenhagen to calm down before the premiere of their play. At Christmas time, Jonas Collin could finally inform Andersen, who was in Berlin, that the music for the overture had been completed.

Liden Kirsten finally premiered on 12 May 1846 with the soprano Pauline Rung and the baritone Christian Hansen in the leading roles. Andersen was unable to attend the premiere since he was in Southern Italy. The critical reception was mostly positive but the play was no great success at the box office and only played four times before the summer break.

Hartmann and Andersen later adapted Liden Kirsten into an opera in two acts for the 1858-59 season and it now received a far more enthusiastic reception. Liden Kirsten was from then on, with interruptions, part of the Royal Theatre's repertoire until 1955.

== In art ==
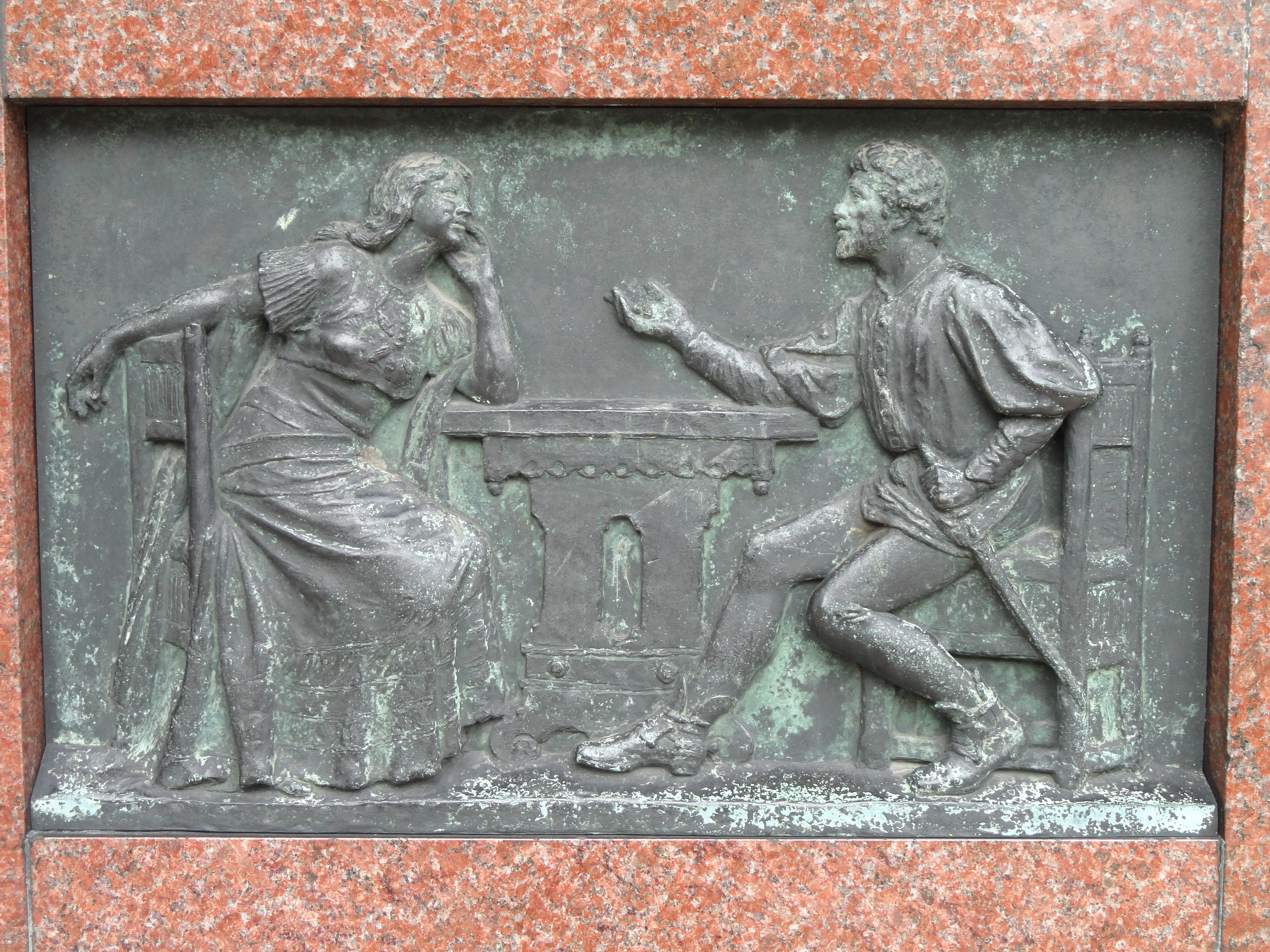
The Liden Kirsten relief

On the left side of the plinth of the statue of Johan Peter Emilius Hartmann on Sankt Annæ Plads is a bronze relief depicting the "Tavlebordsduetten" (transl. playing table) scene in Liden Kirsten. On the other side of the plinth is another bronze relief with a scene from his ballet Valkyrien. The monument is from 1905 and was created by August Saabye.

== Gallery ==
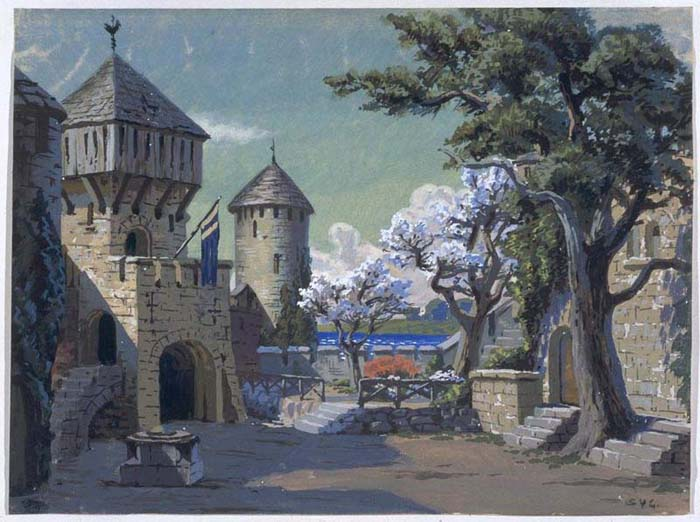
Valdemar Gyllich's coloured sketch for the scenography for the 1874 production in conjunction with the opening of the new Total Danish Theatre.
