= Statue of Hans Christian Andersen, Rosenborg Castle Gardens =

Bronze statue in Copenhagen, Denmark

Hans Christian Andersen
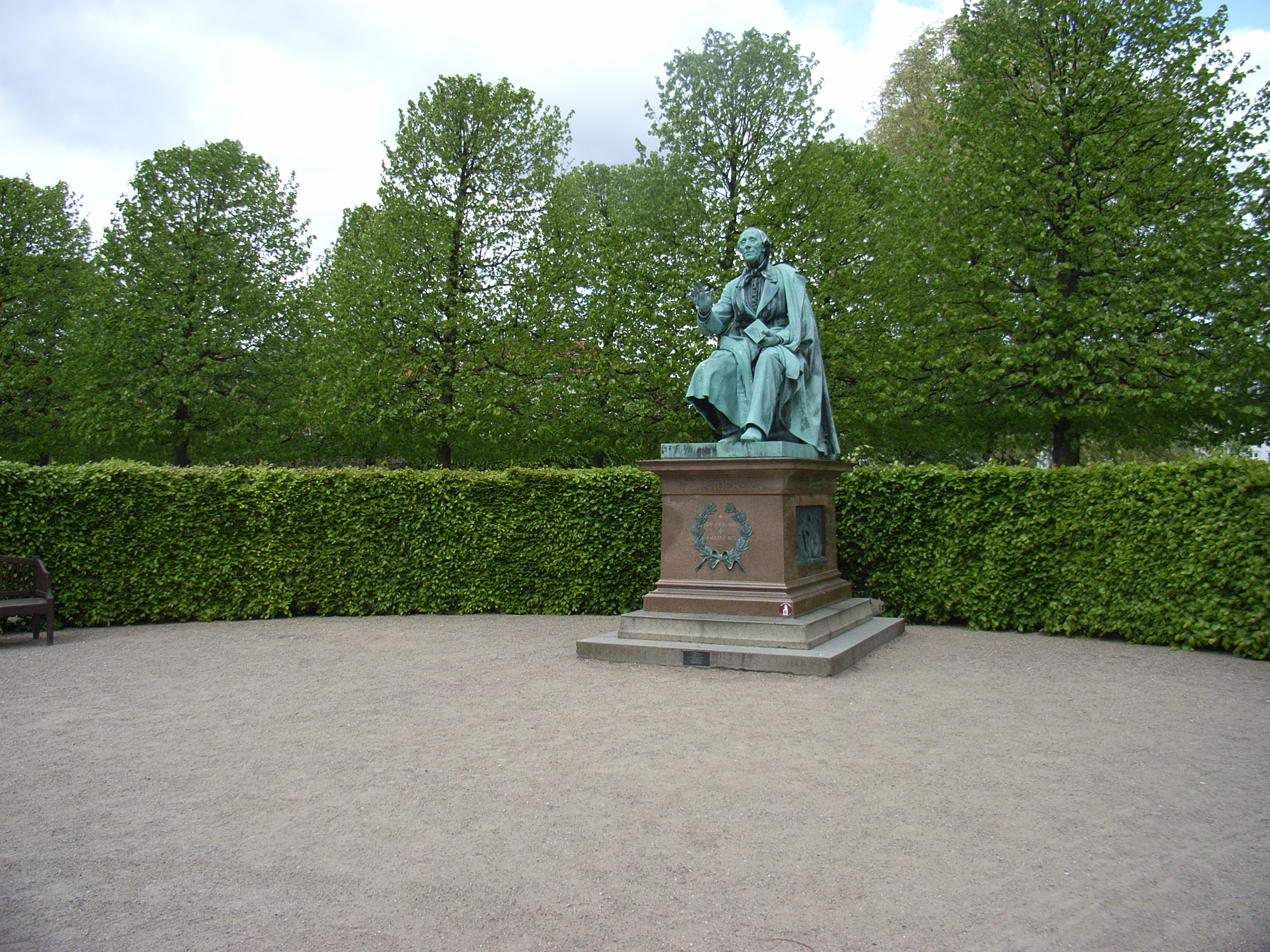
- Artist: August Saabye
- Year: 1880
- Type: Bronze
- Location: Rosenborg Castle Gardens, Copenhagen, Denmark

The Statue of Hans Christian Andersen in Rosenborg Castle Gardens, Copenhagen, Denmark, is a bronze statue of the Danish writer Hans Christian Andersen. This is one of many statues of the author.

== Description ==
By August Saabye (1823–1916), the sculpture depicts Andersen in a sitting position addressing his audience. The sculpture is mounted on a terracotta plinth with bronze reliefs.

== History ==
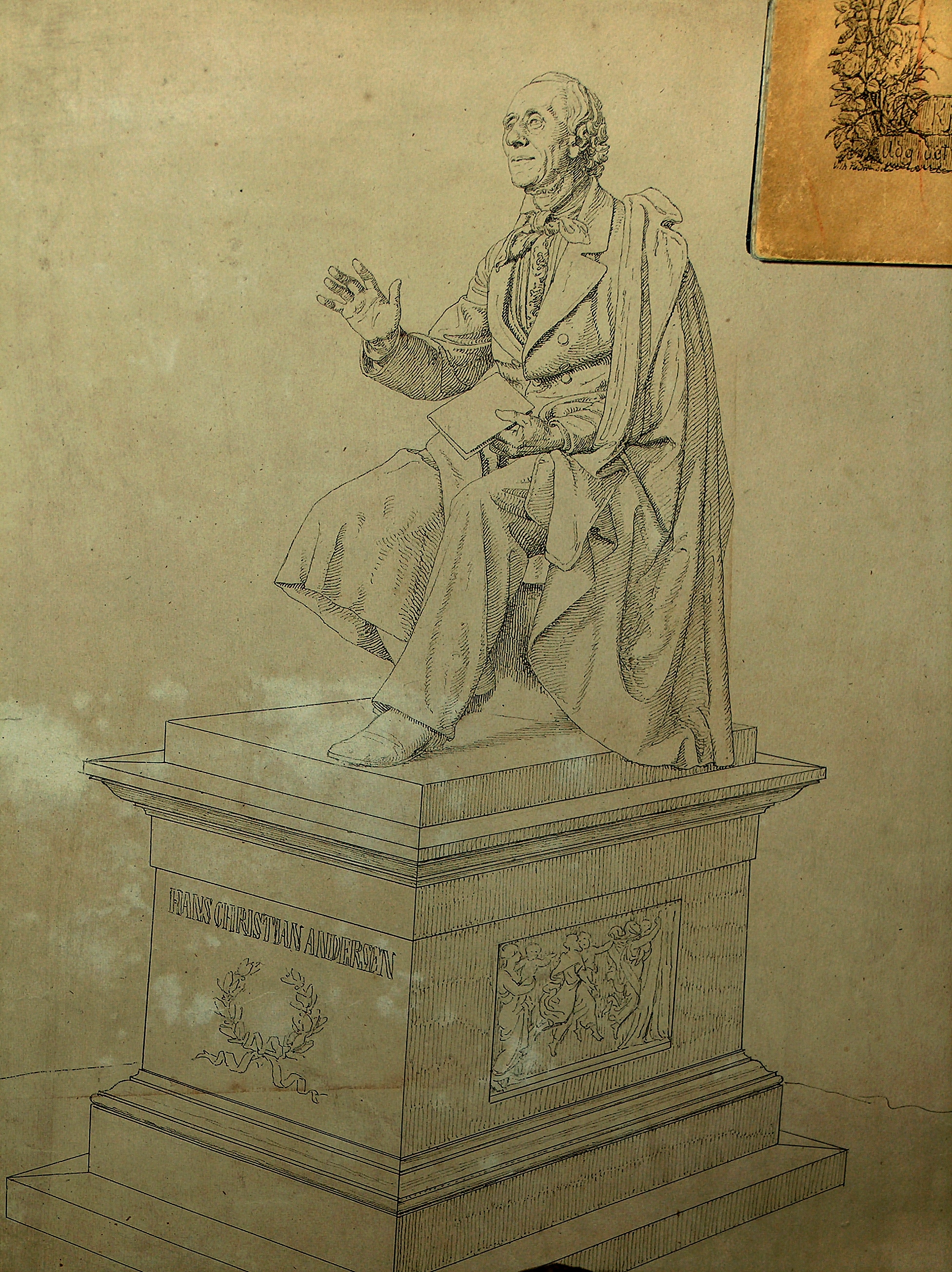
Saabye' sketch for the monument

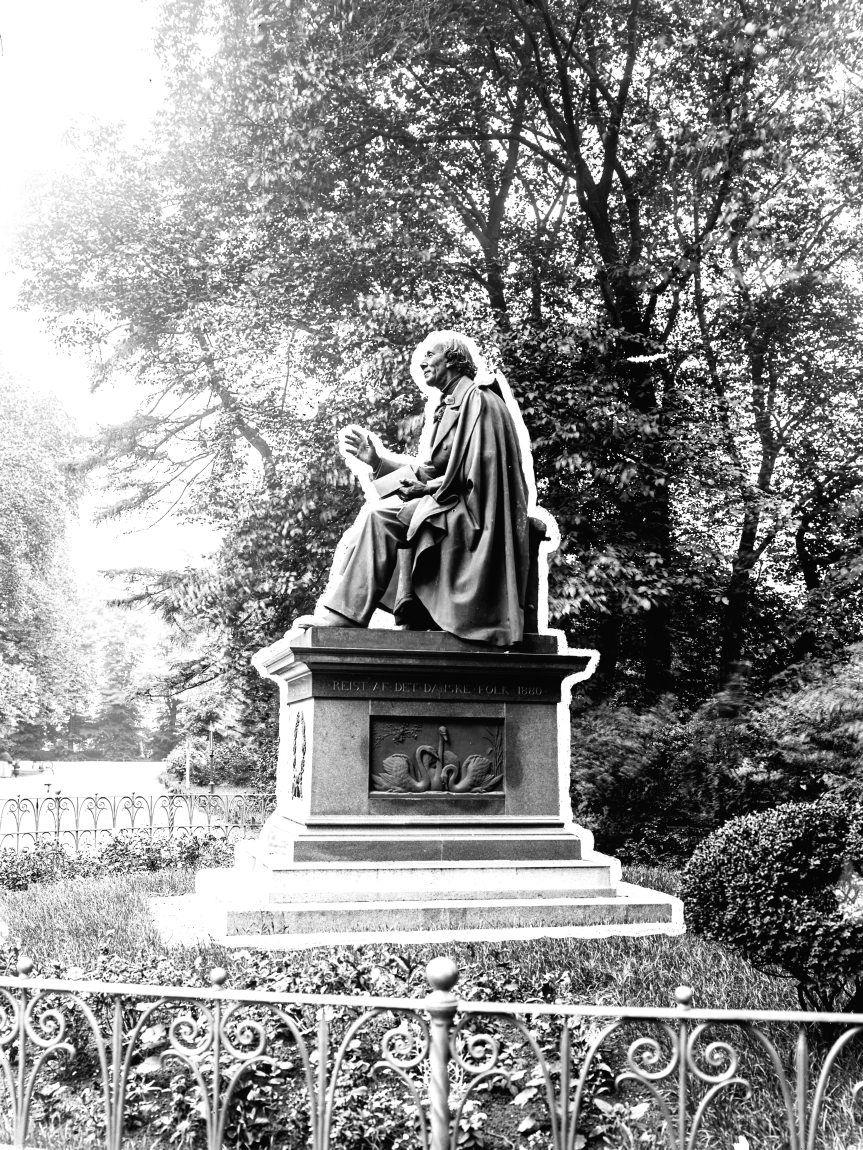
The statue photographed by Frederik Riise

In December 1874, it was first proposed to create a Hans Christian Andersen monument in Copenhagen to mark the writer's 70 years birthday on 2 April 1875. A committee was set up and it was announced that the monument would be placed in Rosenborg Garden on his 70-years birthday. It was decided to launch a design competition. 10 artists submitted a total of 16 proposals in the competition. August Saabye, Theobald Stein, Otto Evens and Lauritz Prior went on to the second and final round of the competition. The other artists that participated in the competition were Louis Hasselriis, Cathinka Jenny Helene Kondrup, Peter Petersen, Christian Deichmann, Thielemann, Chr. Freund and Secher Malthe.

The committee later ultimately selected Saabye's proposal as the winner. The monument was unveiled on 26 June 1880.

== See also ==
- Danish sculpture
