= Horder (sculptor) =

12th-century Danish stonemason

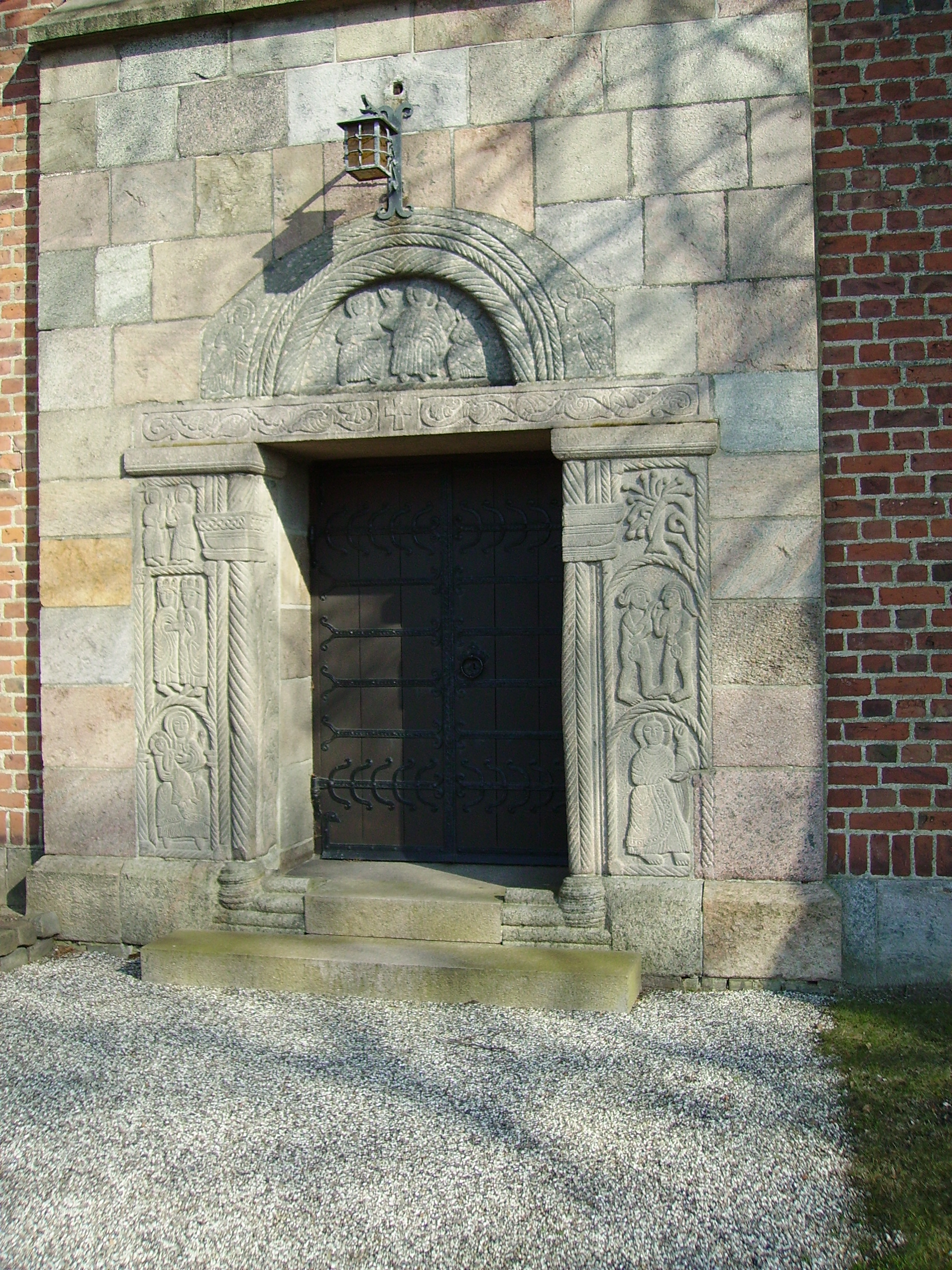
Horder: Decorated portal of Vejlby Church in Djursland (ca. 1180)

Horder or Horderus, also known as the Djursland Master, was a Danish stonemason who was active around the end of the 12th century. The name Horderus was found on a tombstone bearing twisted rope in Løvenholm in Norddjurs Municipality and was ascribed, perhaps wrongly, to the artist who decorated churches in the Djursland area of eastern Jutland and on the island of Funen. He is remembered above all for his finely executed baptismal fonts and portals with their shallow reliefs, frequently framed with twisted rope. Given their shallow dimensions, the reliefs may originally have been painted. They depict either Biblical scenes or animals. Horder's main works are the church portals of Rimsø, Vejlby and Ørsted and the font in Holbæk Church. The fonts are typically decorated with ropes along all the edges and foliage in one or two bands on the sides. Their bases also have ropes along the edges enclosing foliage or animal figures. A considerable number of baptismal fonts were once attributed to Horder but it is now thought that his rope-framed designs were copied by one or more other workshops.

== Works ==
- Gravestone from Løvenholm
- Church portals in Rimsø, Vejlby, Ørsted
- Fonts in the East Jutland churches of Hammelev, Holbæk, Hornslet, Karlby, Mygind, Nørager, Veggelev, Vejlby, Villersøe; in the Angel churches of Hyrup and Grumtofte; and on Fyn in the churches of Kærum and Dreslette.

== See also ==
- Danish sculpture
