= August Saabye =

Danish sculptor (1823–1916)

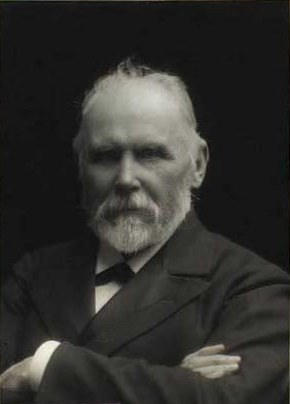
- Saabye c. 1900
- Born: August Vilhelm Saabye; 7 July 1823; Skivholme, Aarhus, Denmark
- Died: 12 November 1916 (aged 93); Copenhagen
- Known for: Sculpture
- Notable work: Susanna Before the Council, 1883; Hans Christian Andersen, 1887

August Vilhelm Saabye (7 August 1823 – 12 November 1916), also known as August Wilhelm Saabye, was a Danish sculptor.

== Early life and education ==
Saabye was born in Skivholme, Skivholme parish, Aarhus, the son of vicar Erhard Saabye (1778–1851) and Susanna Schmidt (1785–1856).

He competed as an individual for the Neuhausen Prize in 1854 and although he did not win, his work was praised so that he obtained the support of Herman Wilhelm Bissen and his father's permission to take up sculpture. He studied at the Copenhagen Academy of Fine Arts and then worked in Bissen's studio, learning the neoclassical tradition of Bertel Thorvaldsen. He initially undertook art and design work, then produced small bronzes, reliefs and portrait busts, with elaborate detail and embossing.

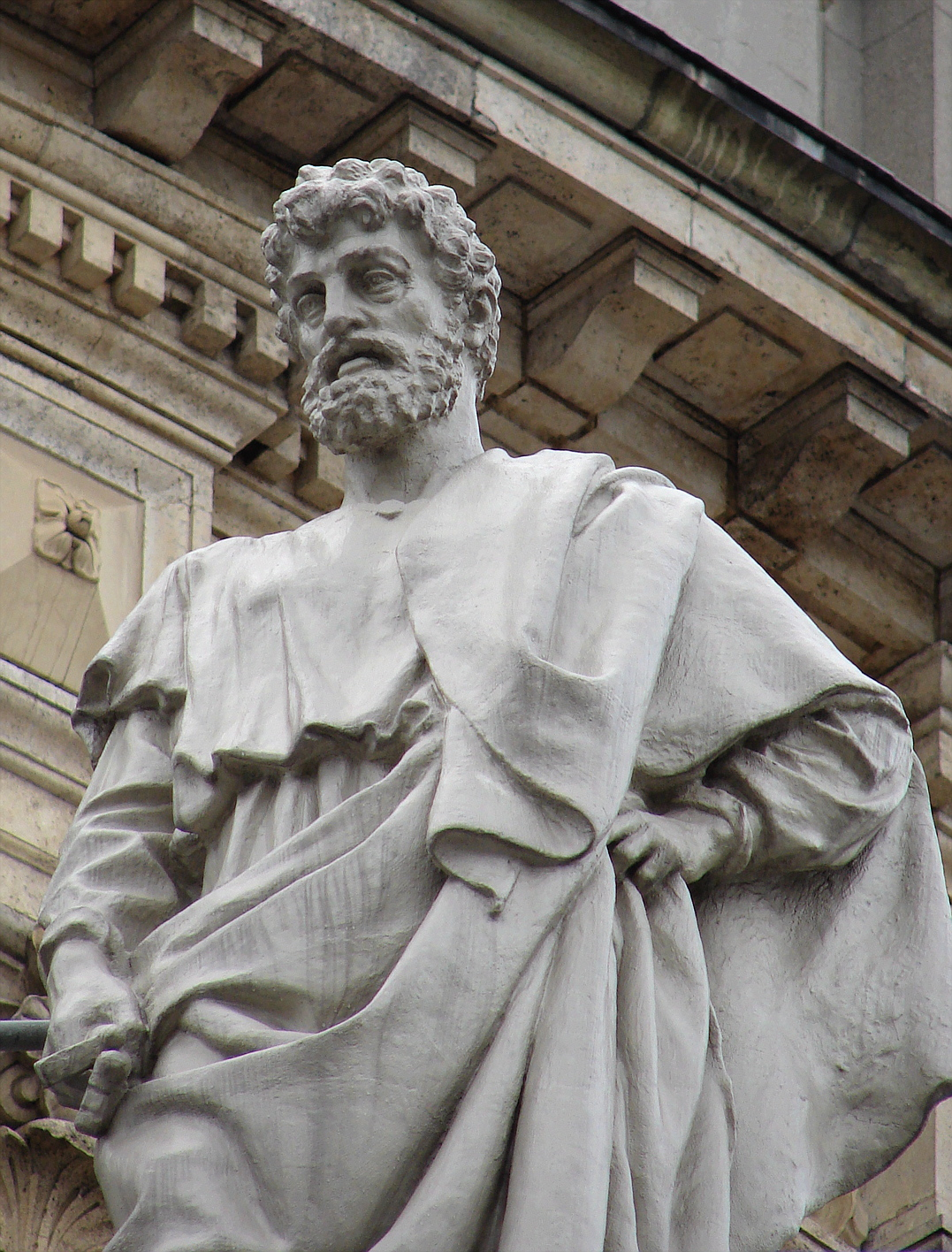
Peter, 1884, Frederik's Church (the Marble Church), Copenhagen

Saabye went to Rome via Paris in 1855, staying there until 1865, learning more about the sculptures of antiquity. Here he started producing larger statues.

== Career ==
Saabye was made a member of the Danish Academy of Fine Arts in 1871. His pupils included Anne Marie Carl-Nielsen who studied with him from 1882, and Gerda Madvig.

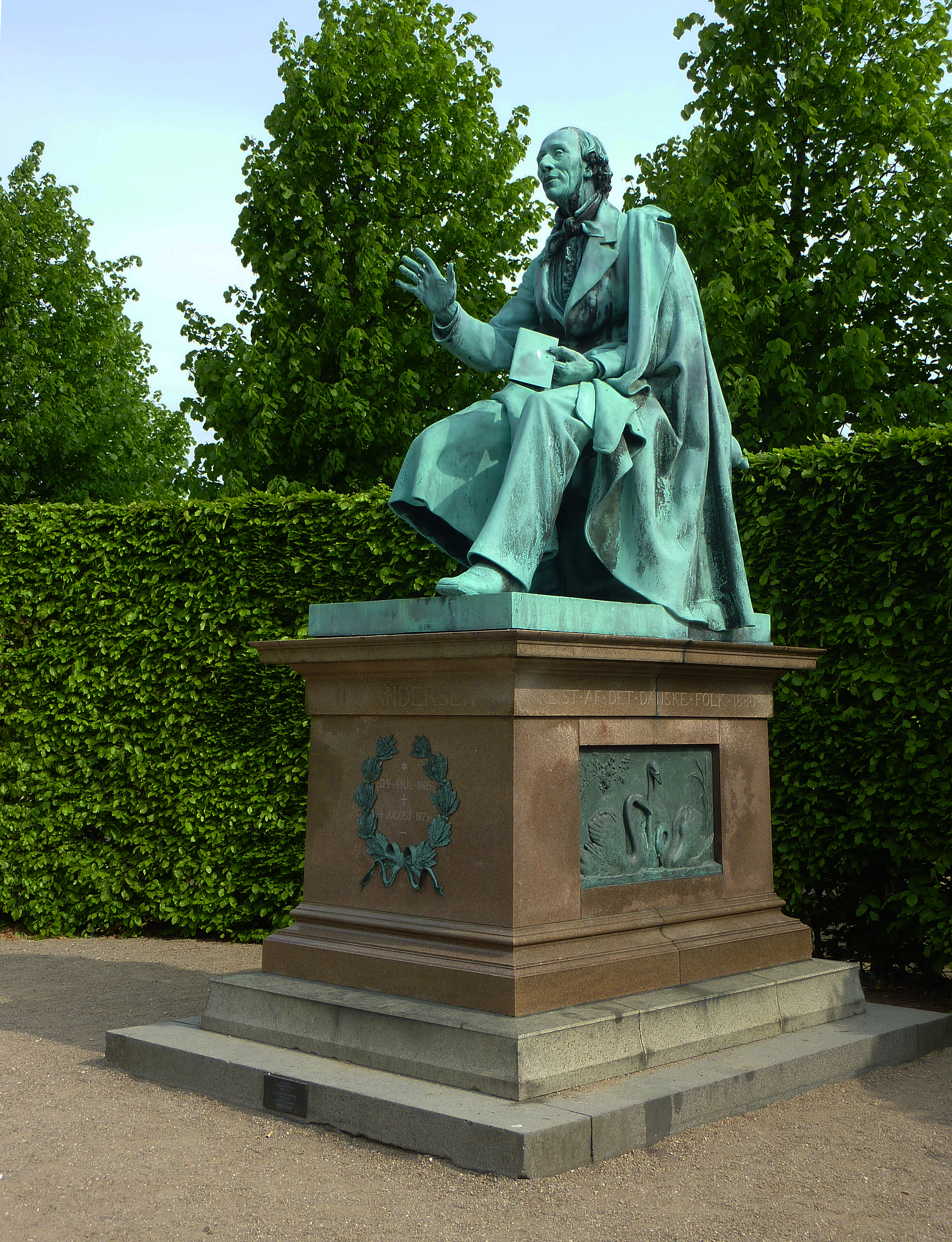
Hans Christian Andersen 1887, Rosenborg Castle Gardens, Copenhagen

A major breakthrough and international recognition came in 1883 with what art historian Georg Nordensvan describes as the "elegant nude figure" in marble of Susanna Before the Council. His most popular work is Hans Christian Andersen of 1887 in the Rosenborg Castle Gardens, Copenhagen. In 1888 he was appointed Professor at the Art School for Women in Copenhagen.

== Private life ==
Saabye married Anna Pauline Hansen (1822–1867) on 26 October 1858 in Rome. They had one son, engineer and entrepreneur Johannes Saabye (1860–1946). After his wife's death in Copenhagen, he married Hanne Louise Augusta Baroness Haxthausen (1831–1911) on 29 September 1869, also in Copenhagen.

August Saabye died on 12 November 1916 and is buried in Garnisons Cemetery, Copenhagen.

== See also ==
- Danish sculpture
