= Johann Hartmann =

Danish composer

- Born: 24 December 1726; Głogów, Bohemian Crown
- Died: October 21, 1793 (aged 66) Copenhagen, Denmark
- Occupations: Composer, musician
- Instrument: Violin

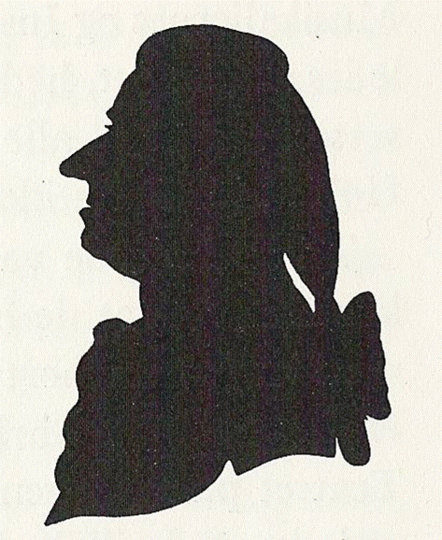
Silhouette clip by Johann Hartmann from ca. 1775

Johann Ernst Hartmann (Note: His real name was Johann Hartmann, but due to a confusion with his elder son, who was also a composer, he became known by posterity as Johann Ernst Hartmann.) (24 December 1726 – 21 October 1793) was a Danish classical composer and violinist. He is remembered in particular for his two operas on texts by Johannes Ewald in which he helped creating a national musical style. The first of these, Balders død, builds on the old Nordic mythology and uses dark colours when depicting the old Gods and Valkyries. The second, Fiskerne, describes contemporary fishermen's lives, and uses melodies inspired by the Scandinavian folk style.

Most of the works of Hartmann were destroyed in the fire of Christiansborg Castle shortly after his death.

Hartmann was the ancestor of a long line of musicians and composers and other cultural personalities in Denmark.

== Life ==
Johann Hartmann was born in Groß-Glogau in Silesia on Christmas Eve 1726. In 1754 he started as violinist in the orchestra of the Archbishop of Breslau, Count Schaffgotsch; later he became concertmaster in the small town of Rudolstadt, and then in Plön under Duke Frederick Charles. When the Duke died in 1761, his Duchy became Danish, the Plön Chapel was dissolved and Hartmann together with some of the other orchestra musicians went to Copenhagen.

In Copenhagen he was immediately employed as a violinist in the Royal Chapel (Det Kongelige Kapel), became a sought after music teacher, including for the later King Christian VII. In 1768 he was promoted to concertmaster, a post he held for twenty-five years. He also quickly became a driving force in the chamber concerts held at the Court in the years around 1770 as well as participated in or conducted concerts in private gatherings such as the so-called Gjethus concerts, which began in 1774, or as leader of the concerts in the Harmonic Society.

The prevailing opera style at Hofteatret and Det Kongelige Teater was then still Italian-inspired, but the fashion was slowly shifting to a simpler French-inspired style and Hartmann was repeatedly encouraged to provide music for Danish-language Singspiele. In those years, Hartmann's first two attempts in the genre were performed on lyrics by Johannes Ewald. These were Balder's death and the Fishermen, and both became immediate successes. Later, other works followed, thus laying the foundations for a tradition that unfolded over the next many years on Copenhagen stages.

Before his arrival in Copenhagen and in the first years there, Hartmann wrote instrumental music for chamber ensemble and smaller orchestras in a style towards Haydn. Most of these works have disappeared following Christiansborg's fire in 1794, as his music collection was bought by the King and placed in the castle shortly before the fire.

=== Concertmaster of the Royal Chapel ===
The creation of a Concertmaster post in the Royal Chapel concurred with its expansion and transformation from a chamber music corps to an actual orchestra. In Hartmann, the Chapel found a knowledgeable and experienced conductor, but also his masterful violin playing contributed greatly to the chamber concerts which at the beginning of Christian VII's reign were highly popular. At the same time he participated as a soloist and orchestra conductor at the aristocracy's concerts founded in 1774 in Kjøbmagergade, and later in Gjethuset on Kongens Nytorv .

=== Taste change for the Copenhagen audience ===
In those days, the Italian opera had to give way increasingly to the French style. In 1778, the Italian Opera Company was dismissed. Simultaneously, there were expectations that new original Danish works be created. Attempts were made by several composers, but without success. Hartmann was initially reluctant to commit himself. As he wrote in 1778, "It has never been my main business to put music into singing matters". At the urging of the Theater Director, he nevertheless embarked on the task, and the experiment succeeded beyond expectation. Balder's Death was first performed on 30 January 1779, and Hartmann's music, in which he had understood to strike "the solemn, melancholy tone", which the poet himself considered to be a main feature of most of his poems, won general acclaim. Strikingly, Hartmann uses no less than two orchestras, the usual one in the pit and an additional band of 18 musicians back stage (including even three trombones and six horns, of which two "corni rustici", presumably a form of lur) . To this he adds three choirs. The "Old Nordic" atmosphere is reinforced by using the martial instruments far behind the scenes and con sordino. The work contains two daring Valkyries terzets (of which the second one is accompanied by a trombone and a trio of bassoons), as well as (following his research on Icelandic music) an aria "In gusto Nationale d'Islandia" sung by Thor at the end of the second act. The overture is drama in the high style and there are two entr'actes the first of which culminates in a "Ride of the Valkyries" and the second one in a storm announcing the dramatic events of the third act. The opera ends in a grand Finale in Nordic style featuring all the soloists and the three choirs and which constitutes the climax of the work. Alfred Einstein singles out this opera as an ″antecedent of the romantic opera″ which was ″written with Northern material seventy years before Richard Wagner″ and which belongs ″to the gloomy, mystical North″.

The following year Johann Hartmann was equally successful with the music for The Fishermen (Fiskerne), whose subject allowed him to use lighter and festive colors. The work is as different from Balder's Death as can be. The overture alternates between pastoral moods and dramatic emotions. The material is constantly varied and the first Act which describes the reactions to a shipwreck taking place off stage concludes with a Sextet in which the conflicting feelings of the characters are contrasted. In the second Act, the rescue by the fishermen is played on the stage, culminating in a final Chorus, where the music alternates between the men and women, gathering speed for the concluding jubilant music when the fishermen come safely onshore. Act Three contains the famous romance Liden Gunver, which has become part of the Danish popular heritage, and culminates in a beautiful Quartet between the two couples. The Singspiel ends with a Chorus in rondo form, followed by a dance of fishermen and fisherwomen. The opera also contains the song Kong Christian stod ved højen mast, which was soon officially adopted in 1780 as the Danish Royal Anthem.

In his compositions for these plays, Hartmann succeeded in creating a new national style, inspired by Gluck. For the theater, Hartmann still composed various other Singspiele, such as The Shepherdess of the Alps (Hyrdinden paa Alperne) in 1783, Den Blinde i Palmyre in 1784, and Gorm the Old (Gorm den Gamle) in 1785. A work of a different kind was the second part of the cantata for Princess Louise Augusta's wedding with the Prince of Augustenborg (1786); Part 1 was composed by Johann Gottlieb Naumann . The list of his surviving works is given below.

=== Work for the musical clubs ===
In this period of the musical clubs, Hartmann was highly solicited and became Concertmaster of "Harmonien", presumably in 1784, as well as composed cantatas for the festivities of several other clubs. Among the vocal works by Hartmann, which were performed in his later years, reference can be made to the music for Edvard Storm's Højtidssange, performed in Kongens Klub in 1787, and for the same poet's passion song Jesu Dødsangst i Urtegaarden. He also wrote Forløserens Død, Opstandelse og Himmelfart, to lyrics by Christian Hertz .

=== Last years ===
The end of his life was overshadowed by domestic sorrows that the loss of an adult daughter who was the support of the home made even more burdensome. He died on 21 October 1793.

== Personality ==
Hartmann claimed to be "a man who knew himself and who was not possessed by himself". The scores of his works also testify that he was not easily satisfied, but returned to them again and again. Balder's Death was almost completely rewritten after the first performances; for some pieces, several different versions exist.

== Family ==
=== First generation ===
In the Hartmann family, Johann Hartmann (1726–1793) is the ″ancestor″ of a long line of musicians and other cultural personalities. With his wife, Margarethe Elisabeth Wilcken (1736–1801), daughter of a jeweler in Plön, Johann Hartmann had three sons who became musicians:

=== Second generation ===
These three sons were:

- Johan Ernst Hartmann (1770–1844), composer and organist, - from 1795 to 1807 - at Frederik's German Church in Christianshavn and then for close to 40 years as cantor at Roskilde Cathedral;
- Ludwig August Hartmann (1773–1852), violinist and singing teacher; and
- August Wilhelm Hartmann (1775–1850), also a composer and violinist at the Royal Chapel as well as organist and cantor at Garrison Church in Copenhagen. He was married to Christiane Petrea Frederica Wittendorf (12778-1848) - daughter of organist at Fredensborg Palace Peter Andreas Wittendorf (1738–1820), and granddaughter of organist in Kolding Peter Wittendorf (ca 1710–1796).

=== Third generation ===
Johann Ernst Hartmann was the father of organist Søren Hartmann (1815–1912) who succeeded him as cantor at the Roskilde Cathedral where he served for 40 years himself until 1883.

August Wilhelm Hartmann was the father of composer Johan Peter Emilius Hartmann, an all overshadowing figure in Danish 19th century music, and who was married to Emma Hartmann (1807–1851), herself a composer.

=== Fourth generation ===
Johan Peter Emilius and Emma Hartmann had several children among whom:

- Emil Hartmann (1836–1898), in his days a renowned composer and conductor;
- Sophie Hartmann (1831–1855), who married composer Niels W. Gade (1817–1890);
- Clara Hartmann (1839–1925), married to composer August Winding (1835–1899); and
- Carl Christian Ernst Hartmann,(1837–1901), sculptor but who also incidentally composed.

=== Fifth generation ===
Emil Hartmann and his wife Bolette Puggaard (1844–1929) had five children:

- Bodil Hartmann, married de Neergaard (1867–1959), a soprano and philanthropist, who held musical gatherings from 1885 to 1959 at the manor Fuglsang on Lolland, where Edvard Grieg and Carl Nielsen, among others, participated;
- Agnete Lehmann (1868–1902), an actress at the Royal Theatre in Copenhagen, married to scene instructor Julius Lehmann (1861–1931);
- Johannes Palmer Hartmann (1870–1948), who established a large horticulture in Ghent;
- Rudolph Puggaard Hartmann (1871–1958), an electroengineer, and
- Oluf Hartmann, a painter, for whose funeral Carl Nielsen wrote At the Bier of a Young Artist.

=== Sixth generation ===
The composer Niels Viggo Bentzon (1919–2000) was the son of concert pianist Karen Hartmann (1882–1977) and thus the great-grandson of Johan Peter Emilius Hartmann, as was organist and composer Niels Rudolph Gade (1884–1937). Architects Mogens Lassen and Flemming Lassen as well as Palle Suenson also belonged to that generation, as does the writer Godfred Hartmann (1913–2001).

=== Seventh generation ===
Niels Viggo Bentzon's son, jazz pianist Nikolaj Bentzon (born 1964), and Belgian composer Jean Pierre Waelbroeck (born 1954), are the latest in this long line of musicians.

Also director Lars von Trier (born in 1956) is a descendant of Johann Hartmann and great-grandson of composer Emil Hartmann.

== Works ==
- Sørgekantate ved hertug Friedrich Karl af Plön’s død (1761)
- Symphony No 1 in D major (published as Simfonie Périodique N° 7 in 1770)
- Symphony No 2 in G major
- Symphony No 3 in D major
- Symphony No 4 in G major
- Trios for two violins and cello, Op. 1
- Baldur's Death (Balders Død, Syngespil 1779)
- Cantata on the Occasion of Copenhagen University's 300-year Jubilee (1779)
- Fiskerne (1780)
- Violin concerto (1780)
- Hyrdinden på Alperne (1783)
- Sørgemusik ved Ludwig Harboes død (1783)
- Den blinde i Palmyre (1784)
- Høytidssange (1787)
- Gorm den Gamle (skuespil 1785)
- Kantate til Prinsesse Louise Augustas Formæling med Prinsen af Augustenborg (together with J. G. Naumann 1786)
- Jesu Dødsangst i Urtegaarden (1793)
- Forløserens død (1783)
