= Bodil Neergaard =

Danish philanthropist and patron of the arts

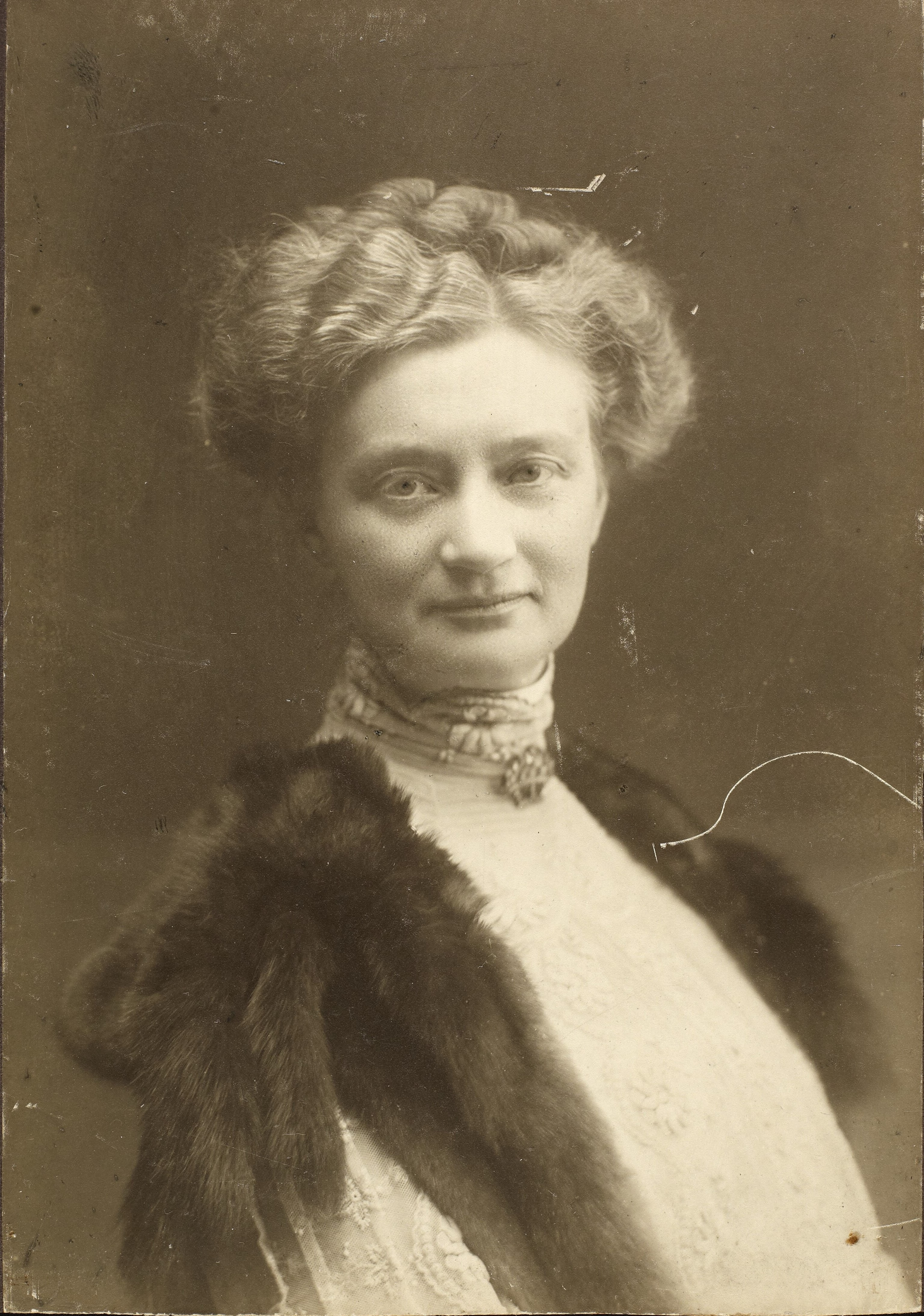
Bodil Neergaard photographed by Frederik Riise

Ellen Bodil Neergaard née Hartmann (10 February 1867 – 18 May 1959) was a Danish philanthropist and patron of the arts. She is remembered for her many charitable activities as well as for her life in Fuglsang Manor on the island of Lolland where, together with her husband Rolf Viggo de Neergaard, she hosted every summer prominent artists and musicians.

== Early life and family background ==
Born on 10 February 1867 in Copenhagen, Ellen Bodil Hartmann was the daughter of composer Emil Hartmann (1836–1898) and Bolette Puggaard (1844–1929). Her paternal grandfather, J.P.E. Hartmann, was also a renowned composer while her maternal grandfather, Rudolph Puggaard was a prosperous merchant, patron of the arts and philanthropist. Hans Christian Andersen was her godfather. She was thus brought up in a home with cultural interests and contacts, where the writers, artists and musicians of the times went in and out.

== Marriage to Viggo Neergaard ==
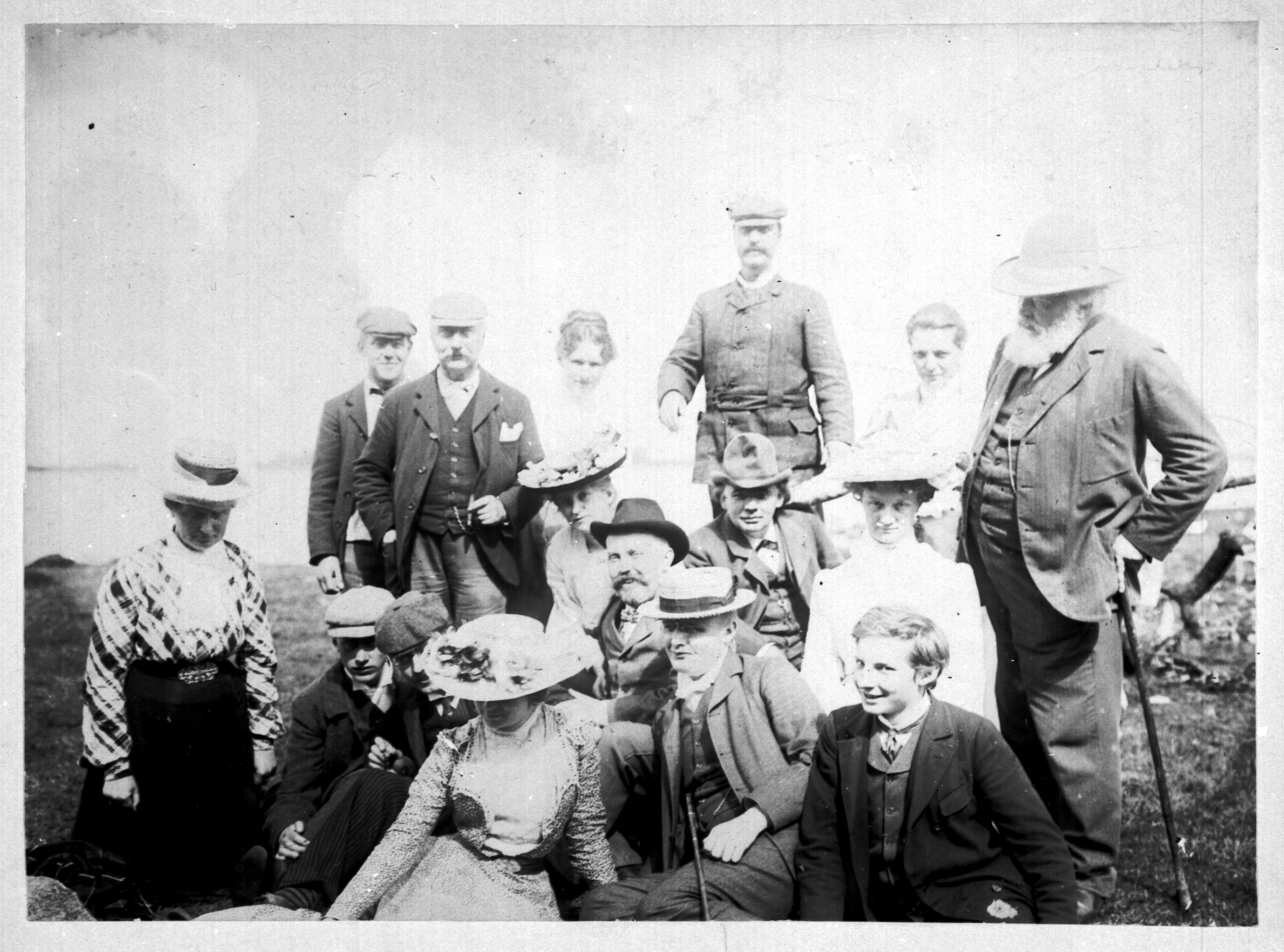
Viggo and Bodil Neergaard with friends

On 2 May 1885, she married Rolf Viggo Neergaard (1837–1915), a cousin, and himself a philanthropist and amateur cellist, who owned the Fuglsang and Priorskov estates, one of the most extensive properties in the Eastern provinces. The couple moved into Fuglsang Manor, to which Bodil Neergaard brought the paintings inherited from her family [3], mostly by masters of the Danish Golden age such as Wilhelm Marstrand, Constantin Hansen, Jørgen Sonne, Peter Christian Skovgaard, Jørgen Roed, Christen Købke, Ditlev Blunck, Christian Albrecht Jensen, Vilhelm Kyhn, but also later painters such as Kristian Zahrtmann and Otto Bache, as well as sculptures by Bertel Thorvaldsen, Herman Wilhelm Bissen, Carl Hartmann or Carl Frederik Holbech. Further works by Fuglsang guests such as Anne Marie Carl-Nielsen or Rudolph Tegner were later added.

Many of the leading Scandinavian musicians of the day also came to stay in Fuglsang. They would often live there for several weeks in a row, particularly in the summer months. During the day, they would enjoy the free life in the beautiful surroundings, sail to the small islands in Guldborgsund, have tea there, or compose in their rooms, and in the evening, after a fine dinner, where the table was always decorated with varied artistic flower arrangements, daily concerts were played for mutual enjoyment by the guests in the large and beautiful music room. Every evening, the concerts were different and they would usually include three major works of the repertoire and also often new creations by guests of the house.

== Cultural interests ==
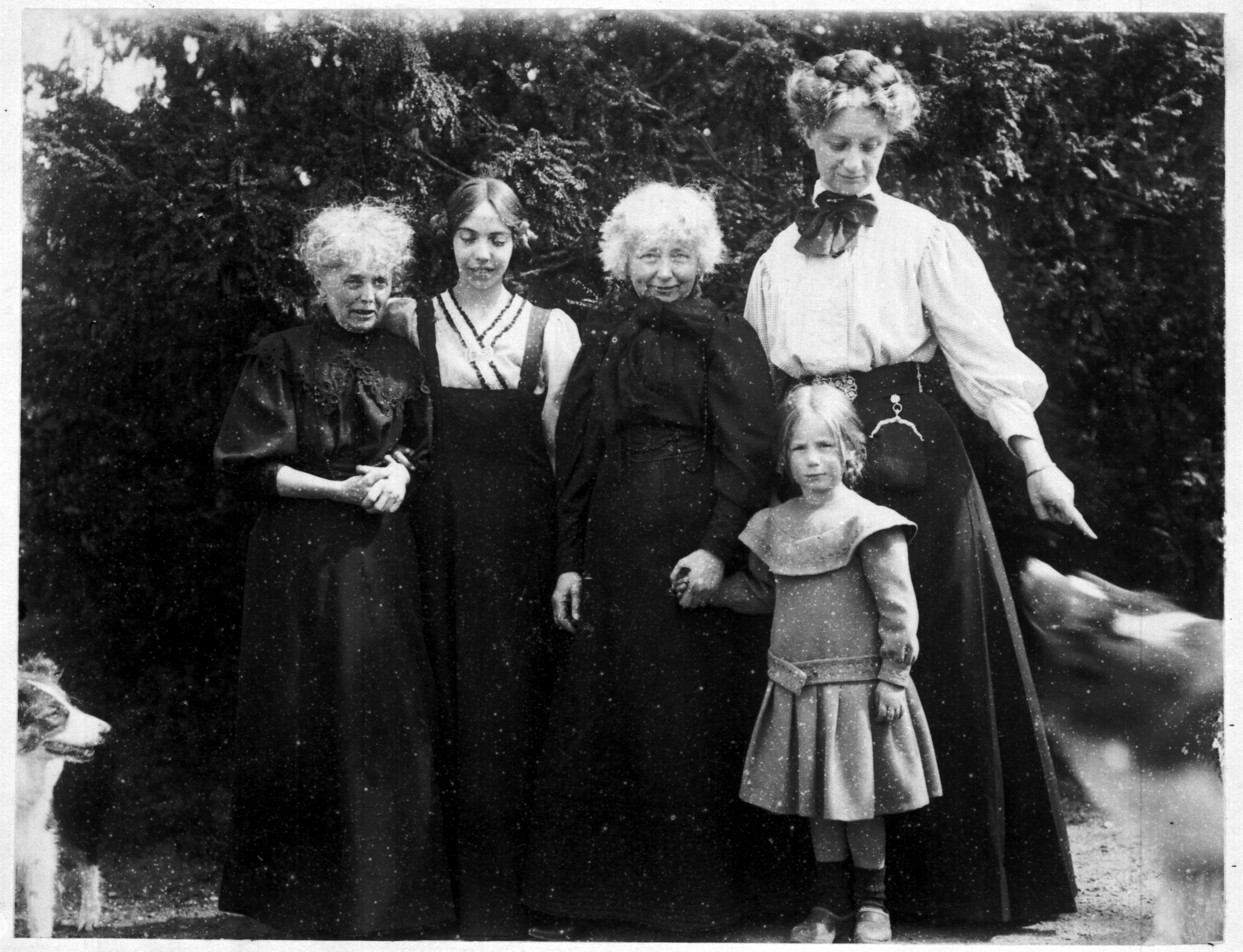
Bodil Neergaard (right) with Tony Hagerup, her sister Nina Grieg, and two unknown girls

A strong supporter of the arts, Bodil Neergaard invited many cultural personalities to Fuglsang. Carl Nielsen in particular was a close friend and frequent visitor. Nielsen's String Quartet No. 4 in F major was first performed privately at Fuglsang in August 1906. Or Nielsen would play for the guests on the piano his newly composed opera Maskarade even before it was put on stage. Nielsen wrote various works in Fuglsang. He composed At the Bier of a Young Artist for Bodil’s brother, the painter Oluf Hartmann's funeral in 1910.

Edvard Grieg was also a popular guest and friend and among those who played the grand piano in the music room and his wife Nina regularly played herself and sang.

Beyond the members of Bodil’s own Hartmann musical family – above all Johan Peter Emilius Hartmann and Emil Hartmann –, other musicians who regularly visited Fuglsang included August Winding, Asger Hamerik and his wife Margaret Hamerik, C. F. E. Horneman, Johan Svendsen, Franz Neruda, Angul Hammerich and his wife Golla Hammerich, and also Emil Telmányi, Johanne Stockmarr, Fridtjof Backer-Groendahl and a long list of other leading Scandinavian musicians of the day.

Julius Röntgen was a frequent guest at Fuglsang, staying with his sons and wife, Amanda Maier, and after her death his second wife, the pianist Abrahamina des Amorie van der Hoeven. He participated as both pianist and violinist and sometimes brought other musicians with him, often from the Netherlands, such as Peter van Anrooy, Gerard Van Brucken Fock, or Johannes Messchaert or the Austrian Oskar Posa.

And in later years, also composers of the younger generation in the family, in particular Niels Rudolph Gade, Ebbe Hamerik and foremost Niels Viggo Bentzon took part in the daily musical soirées.

Bodil Neergaard was herself a fine soprano, who had been educated in Paris as a professional singer by Désirée Artôt de Padilla and was a regular participant in the concerts held every evening in the summer months in the music room. Désirée Artôt, and her daughter Lola Artôt were also guests.

== Philanthropy ==
When her husband died in 1915, Bodil Neergaard took over the management of both estates and continued the cultural activities as before. Inspired by Pastor Johannes Munck of Møltrup Manor in Jutland, she however became also increasingly socially active. Her friend Mathilda Wrede gave her the idea to establish the Sønderskov Home (Sønderskovhjemmet) on her property to house up to 17 men suffering from lack of employment. Initially she covered all the costs herself but from 1923 it became an independent institution. The institution has since grown significantly and has recently celebrated its hundred year anniversary. Her charitable interests extended to providing holiday camp lodgings for some 50 boys from the capital to spend their summers near the shores of Guldborgsund while she made another building available to the writer Aage Falk Hansen for housing those in need. She adapted the main building on the Flintingegård estate for elderly women from Copenhagen to spend a few weeks in the country, inviting them in groups of 10 at a time. In 1919, she bought the old school in Toreby so that it could be used by the YMCA and YWCA.

== Death and legacy ==
Bodil Neergaard spent the rest of her life at Fuglsang where she died on 18 May 1959. In 1947, she had transferred all her property and possessions to the charitable foundation, Det Classenske Fideicommis. She is buried in Toreby Churchyard.

Today, Fuglsang hosts a cultural center, with its own musical ensemble, music association, concert hall and a fine arts museum.

== Awards ==
In 1947, Bodil Neergaard was honoured with the Medal of Merit for her extensive social and philanthropical contributions. Explaining why she undertook so much social work, Neergaard simply commented: "I wanted so much to help."

The Bodil Neergaard apple cultivar is named after her. The variety was found circa 1850 in a field fence at Flintinge on Lolland. The street Bodil Neergård Vænget in Odense is also named after her.

== Publications ==
Bodil Neergaard wrote memoirs describing her life at Fuglsang, published in 1941 and 1944 in Danish as Spedte træk af mit Liv, and as Minder fra Fuglsang: Mennesker jeg mødte gennem et langt Liv (Memories of Fuglsang: People I Met During a Long Life).

== Literature ==
- Bodil Neergaard, Minder fra Fuglsang: Mennesker jeg mødte gennem et langt Liv (Erindringer), 1944
- Bodil Neergaard, Spedte træk af mit liv (Erindringer), 1941
- Bodil Neergaard, Hendes Slægt og Virke, Skildret af Familie og Venner, 1948
- Fuglsang 1885-1959, Billedkunst, Musik og Friluftsliv, Fuglsang Kunstmuseum 2015
- Fritz von Bessendorf, Fuglsang, Kan svanerne komme tilbage? 2017
- Halfdan Grøndal Hansen, Fuglsang, Bodil Neergaards Hjem
- Toke Lund Christiansen, Jeg Bodil, Forlaget Vandkunsten, 2023, 156 pages

== See also ==
- Fuglsang Art Museum
