= Toreby =

- Town
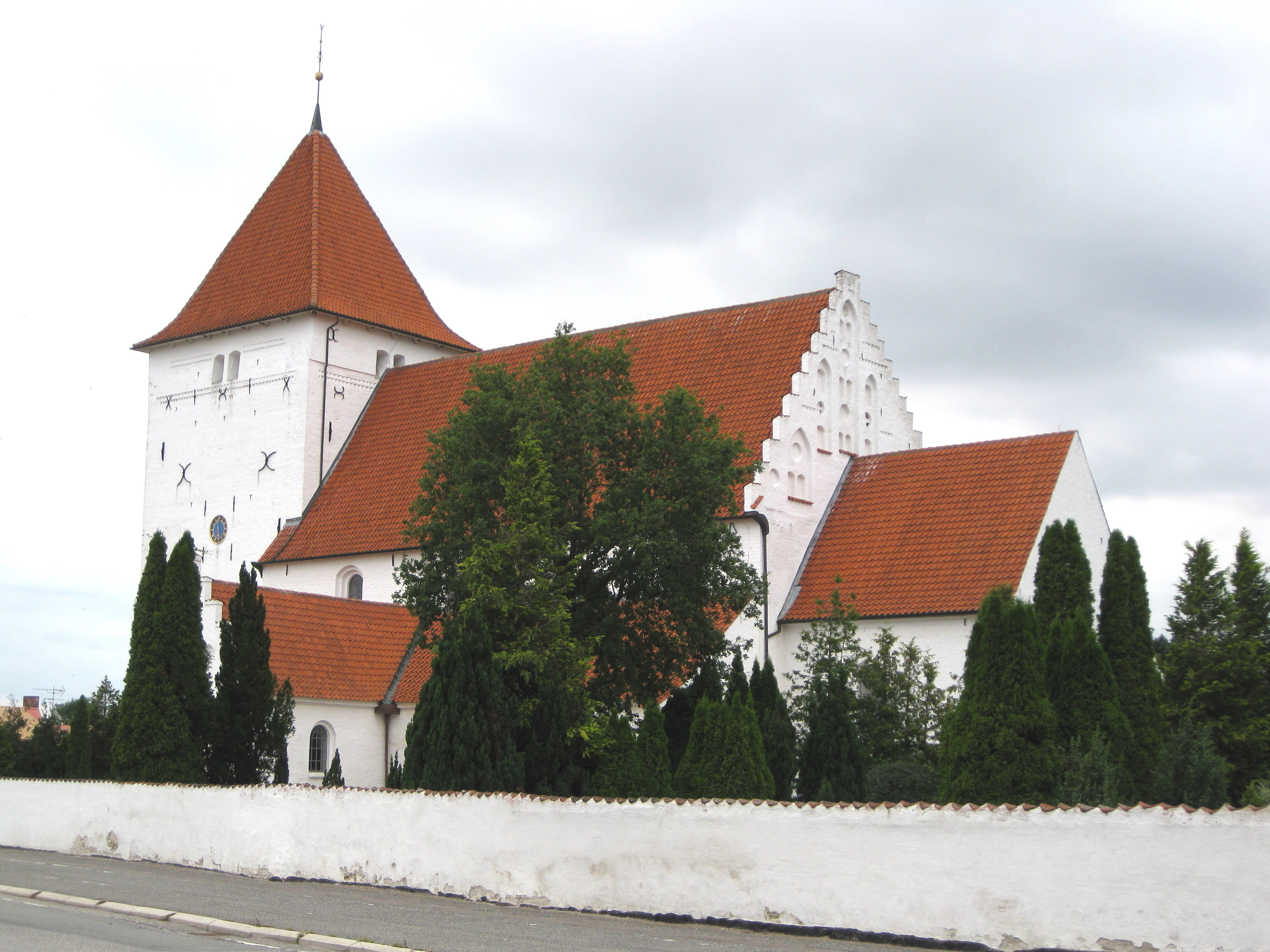
- Toreby Church

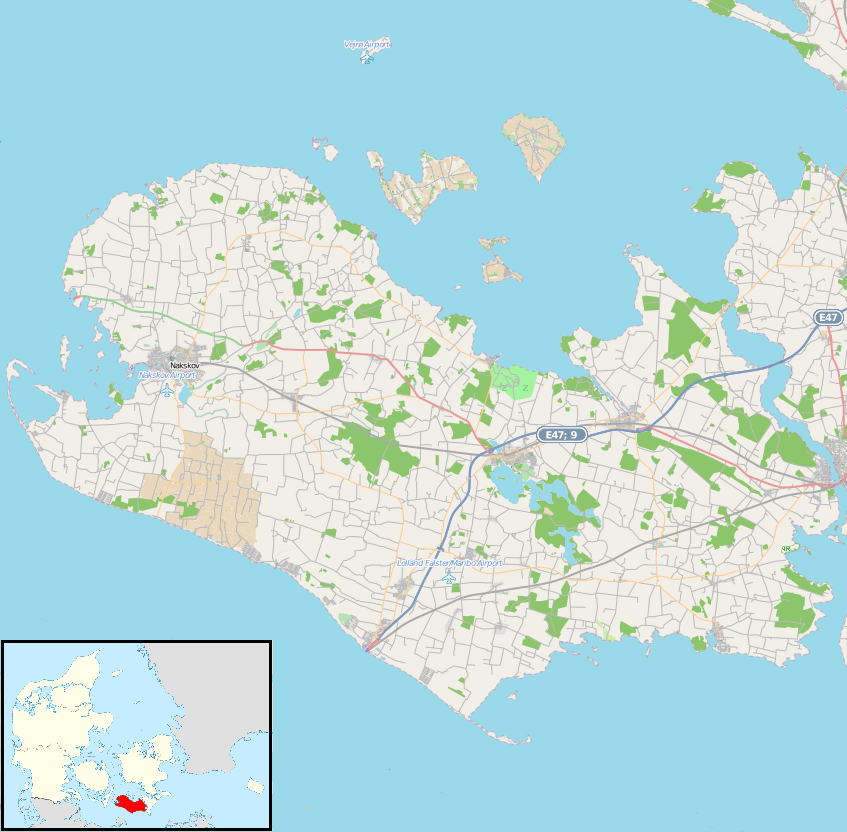
- Location on Lolland
- Coordinates: 54°45′10″N 11°47′17″E
- Country: Denmark
- Region: Zealand (Sjælland)
- Municipality: Guldborgsund

Population (2026)
  - Total: 617
- Time zone: UTC+1 (CET)
  - Summer (DST): UTC+2 (CEST)

Toreby is a village in Guldborgsund Municipality on the Danish island of Lolland. It is located 6 km (3.7 mi) west of Nykøbing Falster and 11 km (6.8 mi) east of Sakskøbing. It had a population of 617 as of 1 January 2026. The main road through the town is known as Torebyvej.

== Etymology ==
Spelt "Thoræby" in 1231, the name is derived from the man's name Thôri (Thor) and "by" which means both village, town and city in Danish.

== Landmarks ==
Toreby Church is an unusually large red-brick Romanesque building whose nave and chancel were extended in the Gothic period with a sacristy and lateral aisles. The tower is late Romanesque. There are frescos from c. 1400 in the sacristy. The carved pulpit (1645) is the work of Jørgen Ringnis. The 16th century writer, Hans Jørgensen Sadolin, was a priest in Toreby; he was promoted to rural dean in Musse Herred. Also mentioned is Bishop Ricolf of Odense who was the recipient of property near Toreby, while guest preachers have included the Sudanese priest, Ezra Jangare.

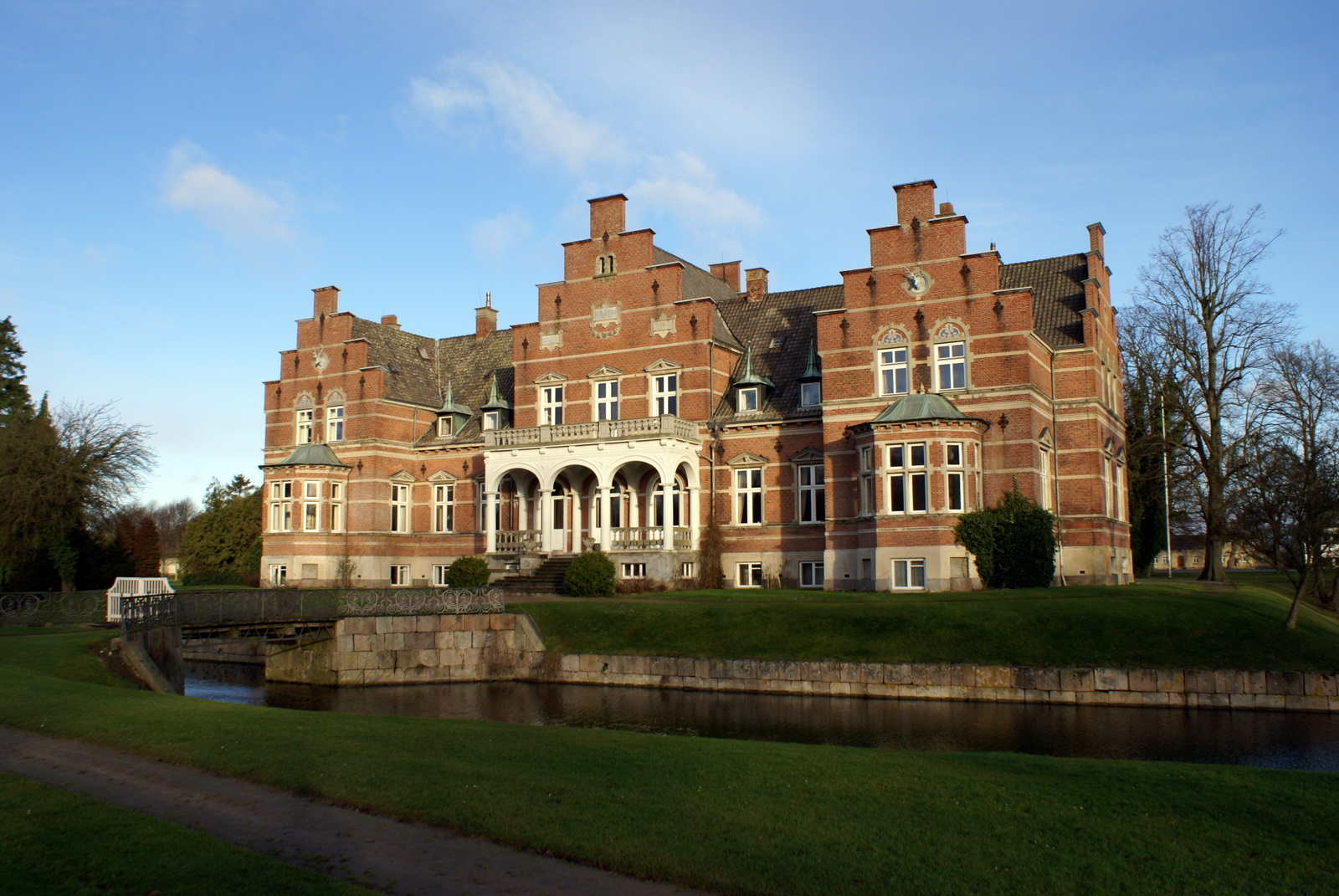
Fuglsang Manor.

Fuglsang Manor and the recently built Fuglsang Art Museum (Fuglsang Kunstmuseum) adjacent to it are located in Toreby Parish, approximately 4 km (2.5 mi) south of the village. The manor house, which replaced a medieval house, was built in 1859 in 30 acres of scenic parkland on the coast by Viggo de Neergaard, an estate owner. His cousin, J. G. Zinn, was the architect. Neergaard married Bodil Hartmann, daughter of the composer, organist and conductor Emil Hartmann and granddaughter of the composer Johan Peter Emilius Hartmann. The couple were instrumental in nurturing musical and artistic traditions at Fuglsang. In 1947, the estate was converted into a trust. The manor house, which is now used as a cultural center, is the venue for concerts and other cultural activities that are held in the large music hall, and the Storstrøm Chamber Ensemble, which was established in 1991, is based at the house. The Fuglsang Art Museum, designed by British architect Tony Fretton, was opened as a museum in January 2008.

== Notable people ==
- Kirstine Frederiksen (1845 in Fuglsang Manor –1903) a Danish pedagogue, writer and women's activist.
