= Toreby Church =

Parish church of Toreby on the Danish island of Lolland

Coordinates: 54°45′21.6″N 11°46′53.03″E

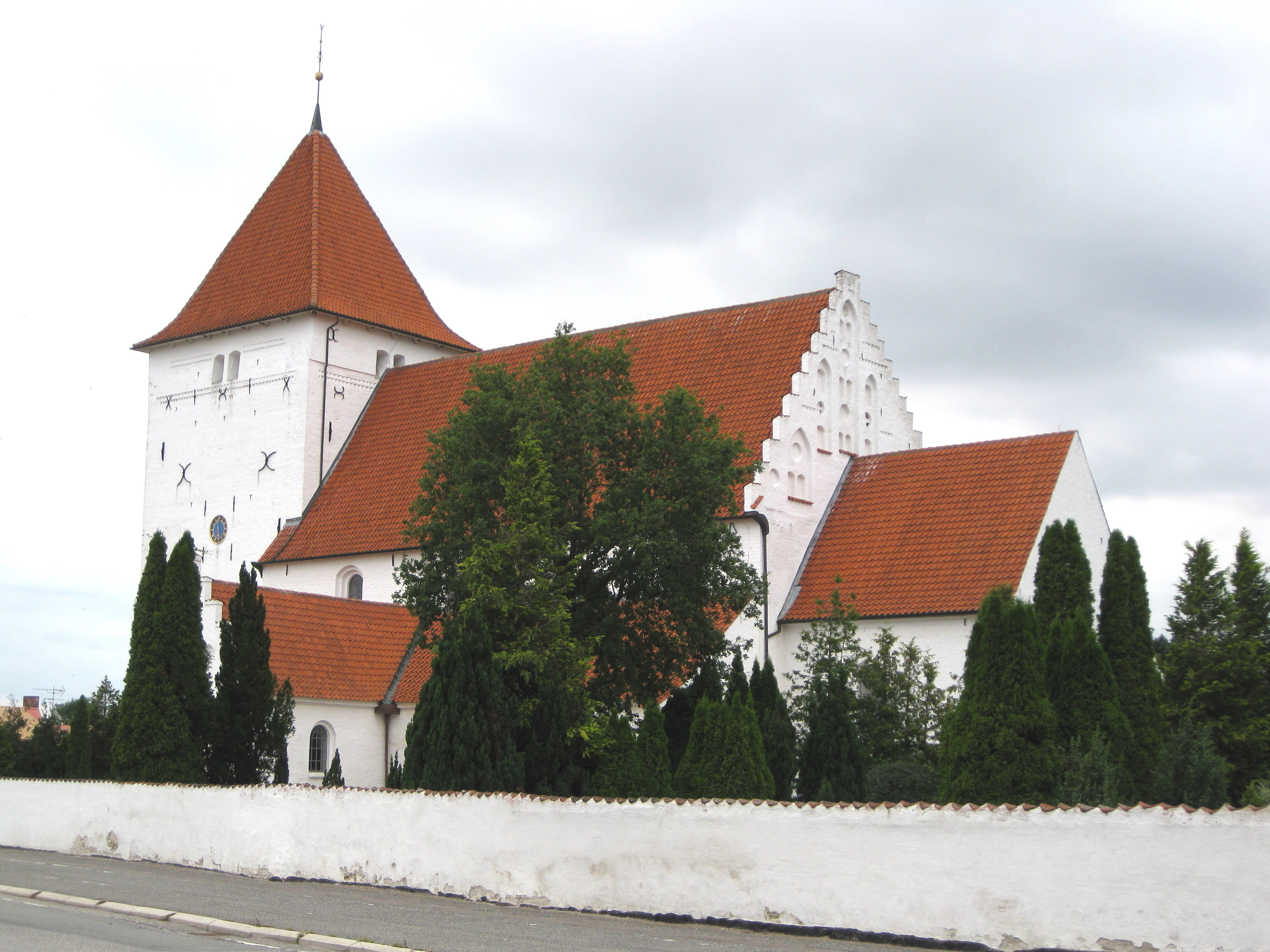
Toreby Church

Toreby Church is the parish church of Toreby on the Danish island of Lolland. It is an unusually large red-brick Romanesque building, the nave and chancel having been extended in the Gothic period with a sacristy and lateral aisle. The tower is late Romanesque. There are frescos from c. 1400 in the sacristy. The carved pulpit (1645) is the work of Jørgen Ringnis.

== History ==
Dedicated to St Michael, the church was the property of the Crown in the Middle Ages and remained so after the Reformation. In 1726, it was sold by auction to Chamberlain Christian Carl Gabel together with the Fuglsang and Priorskov estates. The Toreby market was moved to Sakskøbing in 1550. Later owners of the church include Abraham Lehn and Christopher Georg Wallmoden. The latter is buried in the church.

== Architecture ==
Built c. 1200, Toreby is one of the largest churches in the area. Built of brick with fieldstone foundations, it consists of a nave, two lateral aisles, a chancel, a sacristy and a tower. The nave and part of the chancel remain from the original Romanesque building. Traces of the old apse, removed in the Gothic period, can still be seen. The tower was constructed in late Gothic times, shortly after the church was built. The sacristy to the north of the chancel was built at the beginning of the 14th century. The aisles were added in the Gothic period, first the one on the northern side, then the one to the south. The Late-Gothic porch has been altered several times.

== Interior and fittings ==
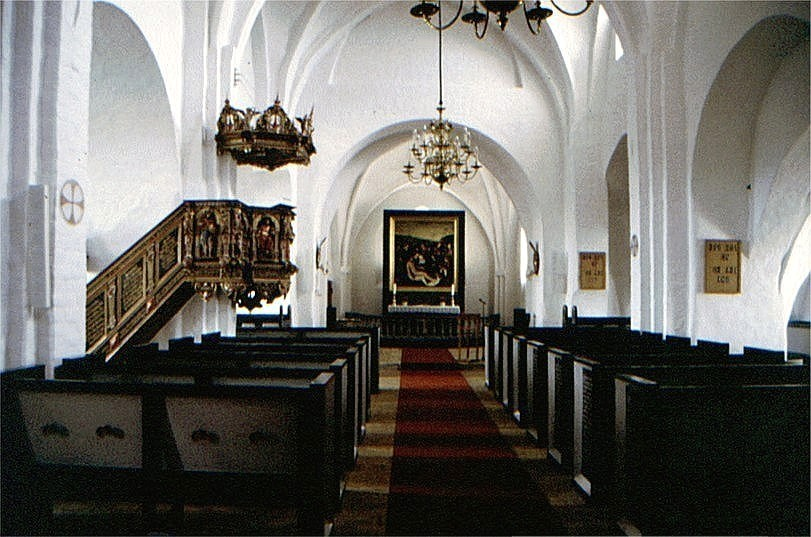
Interior with Ringnis' pulpit

The chancel originally had a flat wooden ceiling, the vaulting was added later. Six-ribbed vaults were also added to the nave and the northern aisle. A fresco of a bassoon-playing angel was found on the chancel arch, probably part of a painting of the Last Judgment.

The altarpiece consists of a painting of the Entombment of Christ, copied from Pietro Perugino's original by Albert Küchler in 1849. The former altarpiece now stands at the west end of the church. The pulpit (1645) in the auricular style is the work of woodcarver Jørgen Ringnis. The north aisle contains a crucifix from c. 1250.

== Frescos ==
The frescos on the sacristy vault were discovered in 1904 and restored in 1920. Probably dating from the early 14th century, they depict the Enthroned Christ, two angels, John the Baptist with the lamb, and the prophets Zechariah and Jeremiah. Traces of other figures can also be seen including Michael fighting the dragon, the Judgment of Solomon and the Sacrifice of Isaac. There are also traces of frescos of Moses, including Moses and the Burning Bush.

== Churchyard ==
Notable people buried in the churchyard include Bodil Neergaard.

== See also ==
- List of churches on Lolland
