= Julius Röntgen =

German-Dutch composer

Julius Röntgen

Julius Engelbert Röntgen (9 May 1855 – 13 September 1932) was a German-Dutch composer of classical music. He was a friend of Liszt, Brahms and Grieg.

== Early life and education ==
Julius Röntgen was born in Leipzig, Germany, to a family of musicians. His father, the Dutch-born Engelbert Röntgen, was first violinist in the Gewandhaus orchestra in Leipzig; his mother, Pauline Klengel, was a pianist, an aunt of the renowned cellist Julius Klengel, born in 1859.

Julius was a gifted child. Neither he nor his sisters attended school; he was taught music by his parents and grandparents, and other subjects by private tutors. His first piano teacher was Carl Reinecke, the director of the Gewandhaus orchestra, while his early compositions were influenced by Reinecke, but also by Robert Schumann, Franz Liszt and Johannes Brahms.

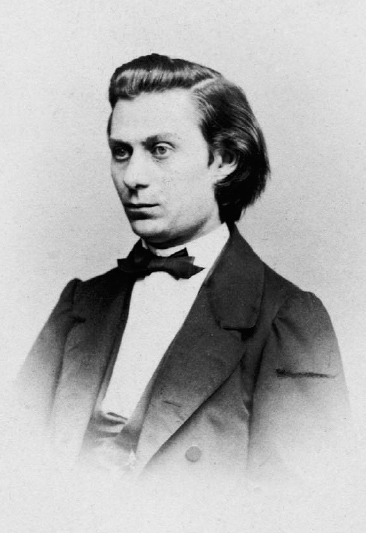
Engelbert Röntgen, father of composer, in 1870

In 1870, at the age of 14, Julius Röntgen visited Liszt in Weimar; after playing piano for him he was invited to a soiree at Liszt's house.

In Leipzig, he and his parents were part of the musical circle around Heinrich von Herzogenberg, and it was at their house that he first met Brahms. Later Röntgen moved to Munich, where he studied piano under Franz Lachner, a friend of Franz Schubert.

== Career ==
At the age of 18, he became a professional pianist. During a concert tour through southern Germany, he became acquainted with the singer Julius Stockhausen; at this time he also met a Swedish music student Amanda Maier, whom he would marry in 1880.

In 1877, Röntgen had to make a decision whether to go to Vienna or Amsterdam. He chose Amsterdam, and became a piano teacher in the music school there. The aristocratic politician Alexander de Savornin Lohman, who was professor of law at the University of Amsterdam and an important figure in the cultural life of that city, was a friend of Röntgen's father, and he promised to take young Julius under his wing. According to Röntgen's letter of 1877 he considered the school "a place full of children and amateurs," since the school was not supported by public funds, it appeared to attach more importance to the number of its students rather than their quality.

Between 1878 and 1885 Brahms was a frequent visitor to Amsterdam. In 1887 Röntgen performed Brahms's second piano concerto, conducted by the composer himself.

Röntgen also played an important part in establishing institutions for classical music in Amsterdam. In 1884, in association with composers Frans Coenen and Daniël de Lange, Röntgen founded the Amsterdam Conservatory. That same year, Röntgen was also heavily involved in the foundation of the Concertgebouw. He applied for the position of the director; however, to his great disappointment, the choice fell instead on the German Hans von Bülow, as the committee seemed to doubt Röntgen's abilities as a conductor. Nevertheless, Bülow was not able to accept the appointment, and the position went in the end to the violinist Willem Kes.

Röntgen turned with greater energy to composing chamber music and to his work for the Conservatory. He became a renowned accompanying pianist, working for the great violinist Carl Flesch, the singer Johannes Messchaert, and the cellist Pablo Casals. Travelling with Messchaert he came to Vienna at least once a year, where he would always meet Brahms.

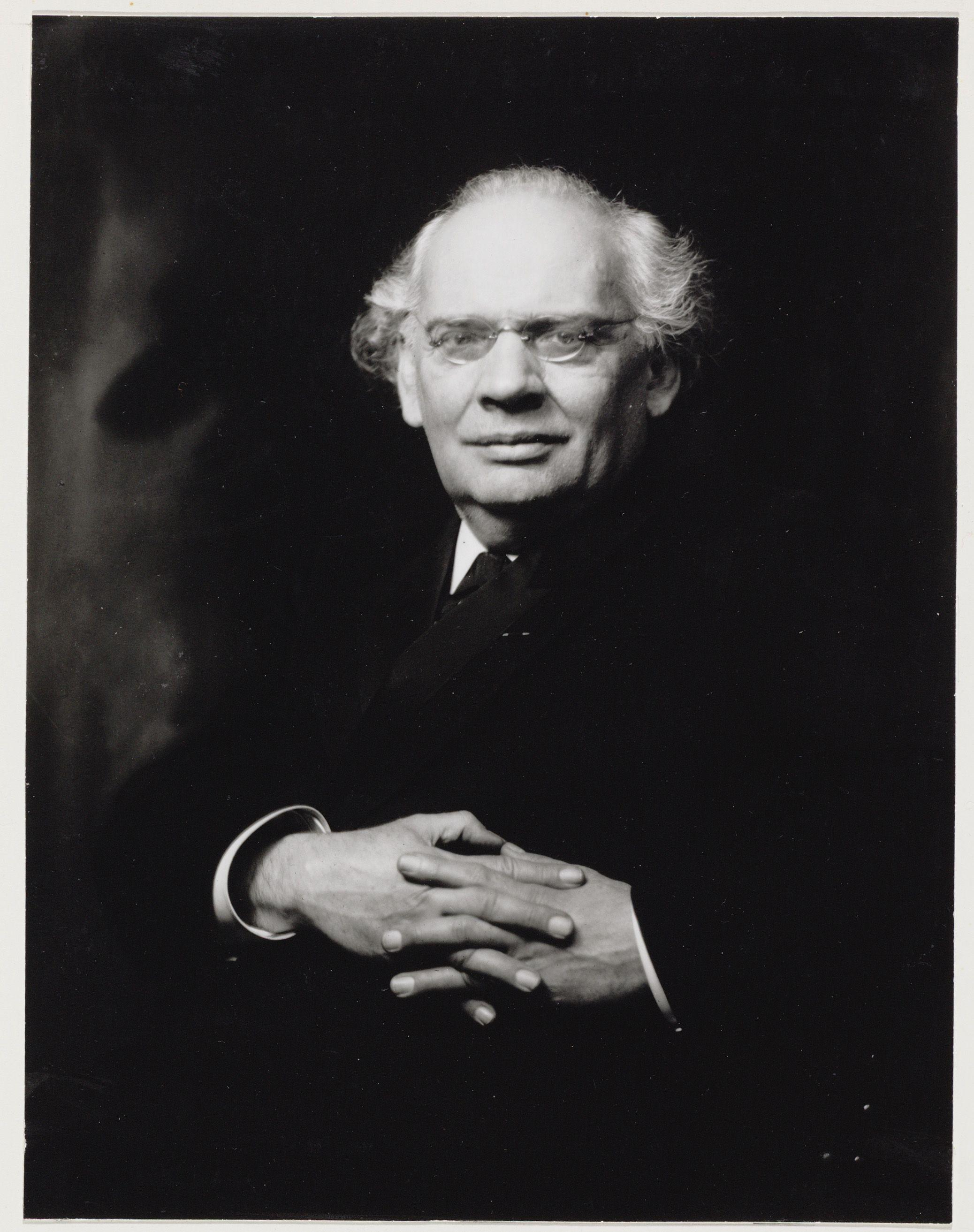
Röntgen in 1918

During the quiet summer periods in Amsterdam, Röntgen and his family often went to Denmark. On one of such visit he met Bodil de Neergaard, with whom he struck up a close friendship. From now on, and until his death, he would spend his summers in Neergaard's manor Fuglsang on the isle of Lolland and play concerts every evening there. As a result of his close contacts with Denmark, Röntgen's children became fluent speakers of Danish. Röntgen's students included composers Anna Schytte and Hanna Vollenhoven.

For some years, Röntgen and his sons Engelbert (cellist) and Julius jr (violinist) performed together as a piano trio. After the death of his wife Amanda in 1894, Röntgen married the gifted piano teacher Abrahamina des Amorie van der Hoeven. The children of the second marriage also became professional musicians. Röntgen's son Joachim, a violinist, founded the Röntgen String Quartet.

At the end of the First World War, in 1919, Röntgen became a naturalized Dutch citizen. One of his sons was taken prisoner by the Germans during the war, while another son emigrated to the United States where he became a soldier in the US army. As a result, Röntgen was for many years unable to visit his native Germany.

In the years from 1920 on Röntgen experimented with atonal music; he wrote e.g. a bi-tonal symphony in 1930. Sometimes he performed as a piano accompanist in silent screen productions with popular and folk scenes of the film-maker Dirk van der Ven in the Tuschinski cinema theatre in Amsterdam. He had already published these popular and folk tunes in an earlier stage of his life. He also made many recordings on player piano rolls for the pianola.

Röntgen (right), with Edvard Grieg (left of picture) Percy Grainger, and Nina Grieg, at "Troldhaugen", July 1907.

In 1924 Röntgen retired from public life. He moved to Bilthoven, a small village near Utrecht. His son Frants, who followed a career in architecture, designed for him the country house Gaudeamus. The unusual round music room in that house was constructed in such a way that its floor did not touch the ground, but hung from the ceiling. During the last eight years of his life Röntgen wrote about 100 compositions, mostly chamber music and songs. Gaudeamus became a meeting place for many important composers and musicians; among the visitors in that house were Pablo Casals and Percy Grainger. At that time, Röntgen studied musical analysis and was interested in the work of Hindemith, Stravinsky, Schönberg, and Willem Pijper.

In 1930 Röntgen received an honorary doctorate from the University of Edinburgh, where his friend Donald Tovey was professor. During this visit Tovey performed a new Röntgen symphony with the Reid Orchestra and Röntgen was the soloist in his most recent two piano concertos in the same programme. Two years after Röntgen's death, Tovey described him as "one of the greatest masters of absolute music I have ever known". After Second World War the villa Gaudeamus became the seat of the Gaudeamus society, whose aim is to promote contemporary Dutch music.

== Death ==
Röntgen died in a hospital in Utrecht, Netherlands on 14 September 1932. His last work, a piano quintet (his third for piano and strings, in G major) subtitled Sentendo nuova forza, is dated 5 July of that year.

== Works ==
Julius Röntgen's works include 25 symphonies, concertos (7 piano concertos, 3 violin concertos, 3 cello concertos, other concertos), as well as numerous chamber, piano and vocal works. He also completed Grieg's unfinished String Quartet No. 2.

Röntgen also harmonized and arranged traditional Dutch melodies used as hymn tunes. One such hymn tune is entitled "In Babilone". It can be found as hymn number 325 "The United Methodist Hymnal" (C) 1989 The United Methodist Publishing House, Nashville, TN. In the Methodist hymnal his name is spelled Roentgen but the tune is the same and dates correlate with the time of his work. The same hymn tune can be found as hymn numbers 502, 508 and 649 in the "Celebrating Grace" hymnal (C) 2010 Celebrating Grace, Inc, Macon, GA.

== See also ==
- Erna Spoorenberg
