= String Quartet No. 4 (Nielsen) =

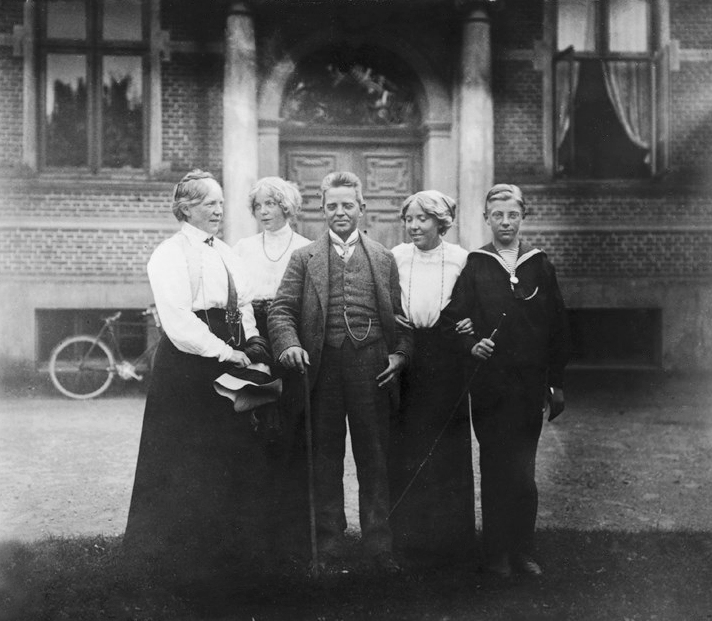
Carl Nielsen and his family at Fuglsang where the quartet was first performed

Carl Nielsen's String Quartet No. 4 in F major, Op. 44, was composed between February and July 1906. The last of Nielsen's four string quartets in the official series, its first public performance took place on 30 November 1907 in Copenhagen.

== Background ==
The Fourth String Quartet was composed between two of Nielsen's major dramatic works, the comic opera Maskarade and his music for Holger Drachmann's melodrama Hr. Oluf, han rider -. The first two movements were written in February and March and the last two in June and July 1906.

It was first performed privately at the home of Nielsen's friends, Viggo and Bodil Neergaard, Fuglsang on the island of Lolland. In August 1906, Nielsen wrote to his friend Henrik Knudsen: "Today we played my new quartet and it sounds as I had expected. I am beginning to discover the true nature of string instruments."

The quartet was originally entitled Piacevolezza after the first movement which was marked Allegro piacevolo ed indolente (agreeably and lazily). In the revised 1919 edition, the movement was renamed Allegro non tanto e comodo and the title was dropped. The work remained in manuscript form until 1923 when it was published by Peters of Leipzig.

== Reception ==
Its first public performance by the Copenhagen String Quartet on 30 November 1907 in the Odd Fellows Mansion, Copenhagen was however less well received, no doubt as a result of its progressive style. Charles Kjerulf of Politiken stated: "If what the four gentlemen with the strings sat there playing last night in all earnestness is to be considered beautiful and good music... then sciatica is a musical treat, for it too is very disagreeable." But Robert Henriques writing in Vort Land was more positive: "In the first movement of the new quartet one immediately admires the polyphonic dexterity with which the composer expresses himself and the merry bird-twittering sound that gives the piece its own tone. Unlike this fresh approach, the Andante is a piece of cathedral music in the pure Johannes Jørgensen vein, often atmospheric but a little elaborate. It is succeeded by a graceful Allegretto, which wittily cheats the listeners out of anything obvious, yet still does not depart from what is possible to grasp. And then the final movement ends the piece in full harmony with an overall impression that leaves one wanting to renew one’s acquaintance with the interesting work, whose satisfying performance is due to Messrs. Ludvig Holm, Schiørring, Sandby and Ernst Høeberg."

== Music ==
- The opening movement Allegro non tanto e comodo is a perfect example of studied casualness by a composer who was an expert at creating music of a specific character whenever he chose.
- The second movement, Adagio con sentimentio religioso, shows Nielsen's interest in music for Denmark's national songs.
- The third movement Allegretto moderato ed innocento is a scherzo full of surprises. Beginning quietly, the theme is interrupted by a forte glissando which leads into a charming rondo. The trio starts with a pleasant melody from the cello followed by a short dramatic crescendo before ending on the main theme.
- The finale, introduced by a brief Molto adagio, moves into an Allegro non tanto, ma molto scherzoso forming the main section. The lyrical, light-hearted second theme is perhaps the most telling part of the work.
