= Godfred Hartmann =

Danish autobiographer

Godfred Hartmann (born 24 July 1913 in Copenhagen and died there on 7 February 2001) was a Danish novelist and editor. He was married to writer and art historian Sys Hartmann.

== Biography ==
Hartmann was educated as an editor in Copenhagen at Gyldendal, as well as in London, New York and Stockholm. Thereafter he took over the Danish publishing house Thaning & Appel together with Niels Helweg-Larsen. In his book I delfinens tegn, Godfred Hartmann describes with humour his 26 years with Thaning & Appel. The edition of the eighteenth century erotic novel Fanny Hill of John Cleland led to a seminal court case brought against him and the editing house which he won before the Supreme Court. In 1968, he left Thaning & Appel and became editor at Gyldendal until 1980.

As a novelist, Godfred Hartmann started in 1963 and wrote numerous entertaining memoirs and history books which have become very popular in Denmark.

Godfred Hartmann was sixth generation in the Danish Hartmann family of artists. His grand-daughter is director Frederikke Aspöck.

== Works ==
- Også en slags rejsende (1963)
- Sig nu pænt goddag (1974)
- De må gerne sige du (1976)
- Christian (1977 – On the life of Christian IV)
- Genbrug (1978)
- Nordsjællandsrejsen (1978)
- Kongens børn (1981 – On the children of Christian IV, with a particular emphasis on Leonora Christina)
- Til London (1982)
- Henne om hjørnet – og andre uhøjtidelige beretninger om rejser og strejftog (1984)
- Urania (1989 – On Tyge Brahe)
- Der er nok at se til (1990)
- Gode Dronning (1993 – On Sophie Magdalene, queen consort of the Swedish King Gustaf III)
- Hilsen fra min kuglepen (1994)
- I delfinens tegn (1996)
- Med ledsager (1998)

== Sources ==
[This entry is largely a translation of the Danish version of Wikipedia]

- Godfred Hartmann, in Dansk Biografisk Leksikon, 3rd edition, 1979-84: volume 6
- http://www.litteratursiden.dk/sw3571.asp
- http://www.dbb.dk/Service/Lyd_og_Punkt_02_04.asp#lop4
- da:Hartmann-slægten
