= Christopher Georg Wallmoden =

Danish landowner and county governor

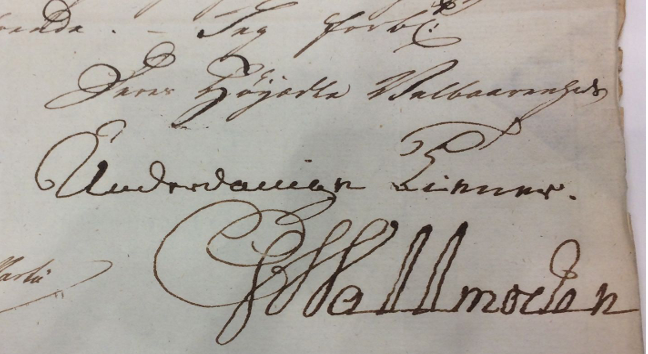
Christopher Georg von Wallmoden's signature

Christoffer Georg von Wallmoden (6 June 1730 – 23 October 1793) was a Danish landowner and county governor of Nykøbing and Møn counties.

== Early life ==
Eallmoden was born on 6 June 1730 in Braunschweig, the son of army major Johann Georg von Wallmoden and Sophia Lucretia von Zühlen (c. 1700–1776).

== Career ==
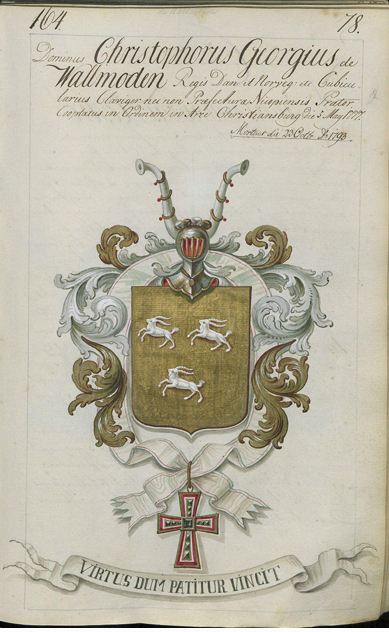
Eallmoden's coat of arms from 1777

In 1744, Wallmoden entered into Danish service as page for crown prince Frederick. In 1758, he was appointed as kammerjunker. In 1768, he was promoted to chamberlain (kammerherre). On 25 June 1773, he was appointed as county governor of Nykøbing County. From 29 March 1773 to 13 January 1783, he concurrently served as country governor of Møn County. On 5 May 1777, he was created a Knight of the Order of the Dannebrog. On 31 July 1790, he was awarded the title of gehejmeråd.

== Personal life ==
Wallmoden was married to Cathrine Margrethe Lehn (1731–1788) on 9 November 1759. She was the daughter of the then-deceased landowner Abraham Lehn and Sofie Amalie Edinger. This marriage brought him into possession of the estate Fuglsang and Priorskov on Lolland.

Wallmoden died on 23 October 1793. He is buried in Toreby Church. He was survived by one son and one daughter. The son Friedrich von Eallmoden succeeded his father to the estates Fuglsang and Priorskov. In 1819, he sold them to Hohan Peter de Neergaard. The daughter Louise Juliane von Wallmoden (1775-1831) who married to Frederik Julian Christian von Bertouch, owner of Søholt.

Civic offices
Preceded by Ludvig Christian von Oertz	County Governor of Mykøbing County; 1772–1793	Succeeded by Antoine de Bosc de la Calmette
Preceded by Frederik Christian von Møsting	County Governor of Møn County; 1773—1783	Succeeded by Antoine de Bosc de la Calmette
