= At the Bier of a Young Artist =

- by Carl Nielsen
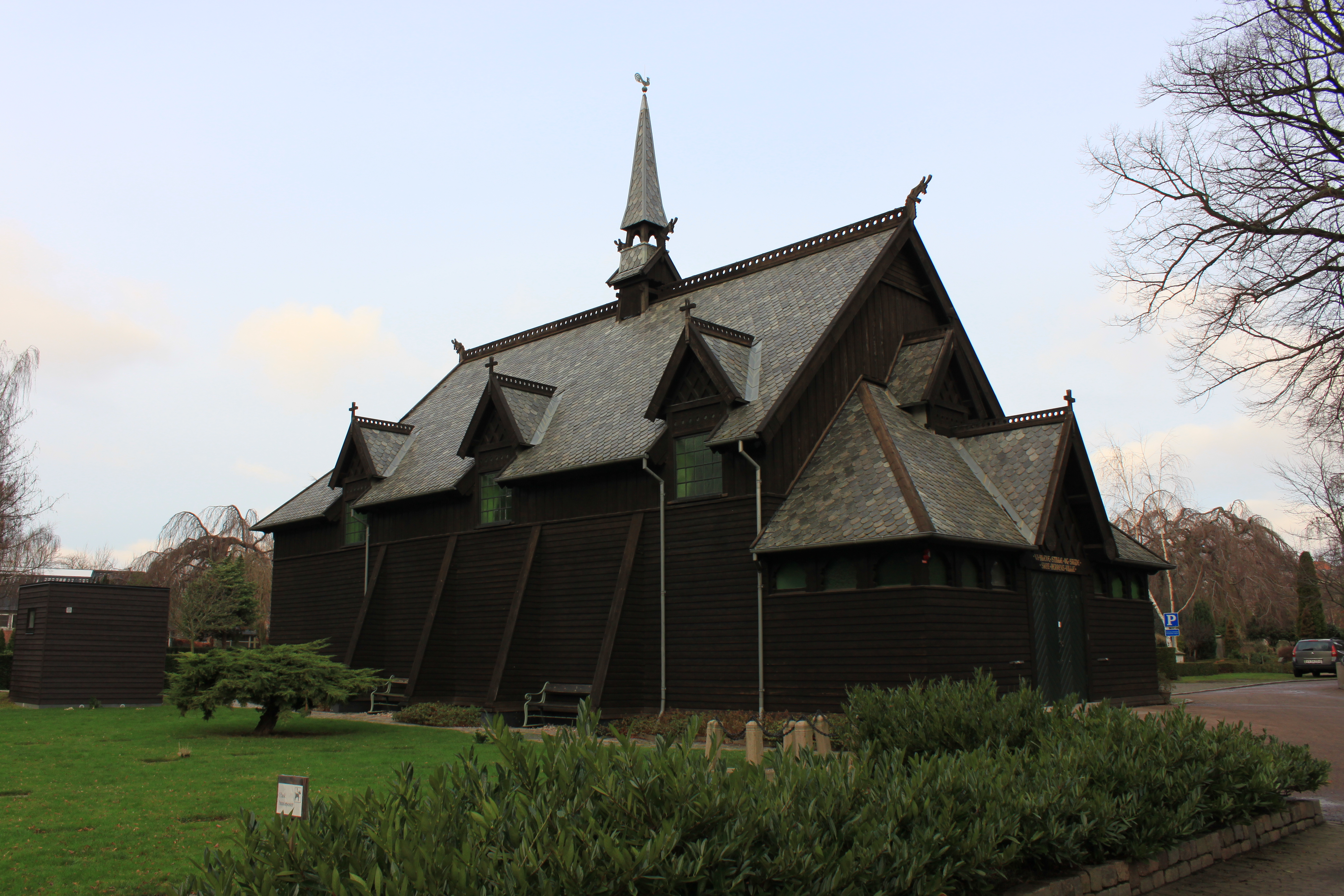
- Holmen's Cemetery Chapel where the work was first performed
- Native name: Ved en ung Kunstners Baare
- Key: E♭ minor
- Catalogue: FS 58
- Dedication: Oluf Hartmann
- Performed: 21 January 2010: Copenhagen
- Scoring: string quartet; string orchestra

Carl Nielsen's At the Bier of a Young Artist (Ved en ung Kunstners Baare) for string orchestra, FS 58, was written for the funeral of the Danish painter Oluf Hartmann in January 1910.

== Background ==
Oluf Hartmann was the son of composer Emil Hartmann and the brother of Bodil Neergaard, the lady of Fuglsang Manor, a gathering place for musicians and artists on the Danish island of Lolland. Hartmann died on Sunday, 16 January 1910. By the following Wednesday, Nielsen had completed the draft of his "Andante lamentoso". Perhaps originally written for string quartet, the piece was later adapted by the composer for string orchestra.

The four-minute piece in E♭ minor was first performed by the Gade Quartet at Oluf Hartmann’s funeral on 21 January in the chapel at Holmen’s Cemetery in Copenhagen. By April 1912, Nielsen had adapted it for strings in connection with an Easter concert he conducted at the Church of Our Lady in Copenhagen. He conducted the piece on several other occasions during his lifetime and it was also played at his funeral on 9 October 1931 by his son-in-law Emil Telmányi's chamber orchestra.

The piece has been known under different names. It was first entitled "Andante doloroso" for the concerts in Copenhagen in 1912 and then it became known as "Andante dolorosa (Ved en ung Kunstners Baare)" or "Andante dolorosa (At the Bier of a Young Artist)".

== Music ==
Writing in connection with Deutsche Grammophon's recording by the Emerson String Quartet, Anthony Burton writes: "In the dark key of E flat minor, with an initially subdued middle section in D major and a calm major-key ending, it has a poignant intensity quite remarkable for a work of its modest duration".
