= List of county governors of Nykøbing =

This list of county governors of Nykøbing lists county governors (Danish: Amtmænd, singular Amtmand) of Nykøbing County, Denmark. In 1803, Nykøbing was merged with Maribo County under the latter's name.

== List ==
Portrait	Name	Term	Notes
	Christopher Lindenov	1657—1661	
	[Dronningen]	1661—1672	
	Cornelius Lerche	1672—1681	
	Thomas Grote	1681—1686	
	Marcus Gøye	1686—1691	
	Henning Ulrich Lützow	1691—1722	
	Jørgen Ernst von Reichou	1722—1735	
	Peter Ncve	1735—1737	
	Frederik Christian Raben	1737—1763	
	Hans Landorph	1722—1738	
	Peter Otto Rosenørn	1738—1751	
	Gideon von der Lühe	1738—1751	
	Ludvig Christian von Oertz	1738—1751	
	Christopher Georg Wallmoden	1772—1793	
	Antoine de Bosc de la Calmette	1793—1803	
