= Oluf Hartmann =

Danish painter

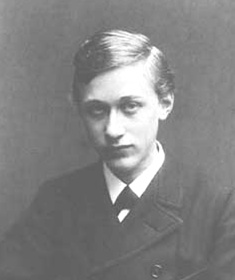
- Born: 16 February 1879; Søllerød, Denmark
- Died: 16 January 1910 (aged 30); Copenhagen, Denmark
- Resting place: Cemetery of Holmen
- Occupation: artist

Oluf Hartmann (16 February 1879 – 16 January 1910) was a Danish painter. Trained at the Royal Danish Academy of Fine Arts in Copenhagen, he showed his works at important exhibitions in the 1900s.

== Career ==
Hartmann was born in the house Carlsminde in Søllerød, Denmark, the son of composer Emil Hartmann and grandson of composer Johan Peter Emilius Hartmann. He grew up in a family where there was great interest in music, art, literature, and travel.

As a boy he revealed a talent for drawing, and attended the academy of Gustav and Sophus Vermehren from 1896 to 1902, under the tutelage of Frants Henningsen. After completing studies there, he enrolled at Kristian Zahrtmann's school from 1902 to 1904, where he was exposed to an avant–garde art scene and was taught color and form processing. He then studied for three years at the Royal Danish Academy of Fine Arts in Copenhagen.

During his short career, he made some study trips abroad in 1902–1909 to Italy, Belgium, Holland and Paris. He also stayed at his sister Bodil de Neergaard's place at the Fuglsang Manor on the isle of Lolland. The place hosted every Summer many artists and musicians of the day in Scandinavia. In the evening, concerts were organised in the large music room. Oluf Hartmann met there among others Edvard Grieg and Carl Nielsen.

His paintings frequently draw subjects from mythology or the Bible and mix traditional and modern styles, with classical outline and geometric composition holding figures which border abstract art. The colors he used were muted, similar to paintings by Delacroix, Goya and Rembrandt. Hartmann was seen as one of the up-and-coming artists of his generation and his works were well regarded by his peers. André Salmon published after his death in Paris a collection of ten of Hartmann's engravings together with an introduction and a biographical notice.

Some of his works feature images from the Skejten Nature Reserve at Fuglsang. Though mostly in a small format, they are powerful with bright colours and a beautiful rendering of light. It is possible that Hartmann met Olaf Rude or other painting peers there, as Rude's parents had a farm near Fuglsang and he painted some of his most famous images from scenes at Skejten. For a time his works were forgotten, but there has been a recent resurgence of interest in his art. In his groundbreaking book on Danish art in the 20th century, art historian Mikael Wivel singled out Hartmann as the starting point for the development of 20th century painting in Denmark. After Hartmann's death there have been regular exhibitions of his works in Denmark, Scandinavia and several times in Italy.

He exhibited at the Charlottenborg Spring Exhibition in 1905 and 1907 at Den Frie Udstilling in 1908 and 1909. He died 16 January 1910, in Copenhagen, after an unsuccessful appendectomy.

Carl Nielsen wrote At the Bier of a Young Artist for his funeral. After his death, his siblings founded the Oluf Hartmann's scholarship for young painters.

== Selected works ==
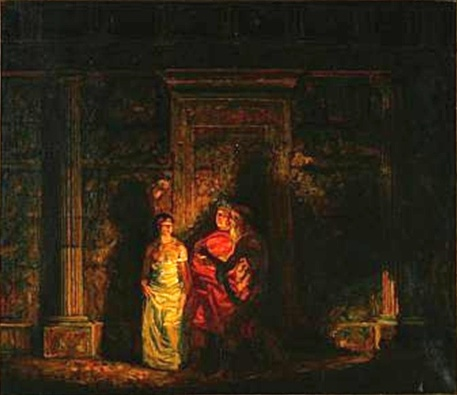
Diogenes søger et menneske (Diogenes looking for a[n honest] human being, c. 1905), Fuglsang Kunstmuseum

- Høstscene, Portofino (1902 – Fuglsang Art Museum)
- Diogenes søger et menneske (ca. 1905 – Fuglsang Art Museum)
- Jakobs kamp med englen (1906 – ARoS Aarhus Kunstmuseum)
- Jakobs kamp med englen (1907 – National Gallery of Denmark)
- Striden om Patrokles lig (1907 – National Gallery of Denmark)
- Striden om Patrokles lig (1907 – Museum Jorn, Silkeborg)
- To hekse, der slås (1908 – Fyns Kunstmuseum)
- Selvportræt (1908 – Carl Nielsen Museum)
- To mænd, der slås (ca. 1909 – Fuglsang Art Museum)
- Tobias med fisken (1909)
- Landskab, Skejten ved Fuglsang (1909 – Fuglsang Art Museum)
- Susanne (1909–10 – National Gallery of Denmark)
- drawings and etchings in Graphic Art at the National Gallery of Denmark
