= Hanna Vollenhoven =

Dutch composer and pianist (1889–1972)

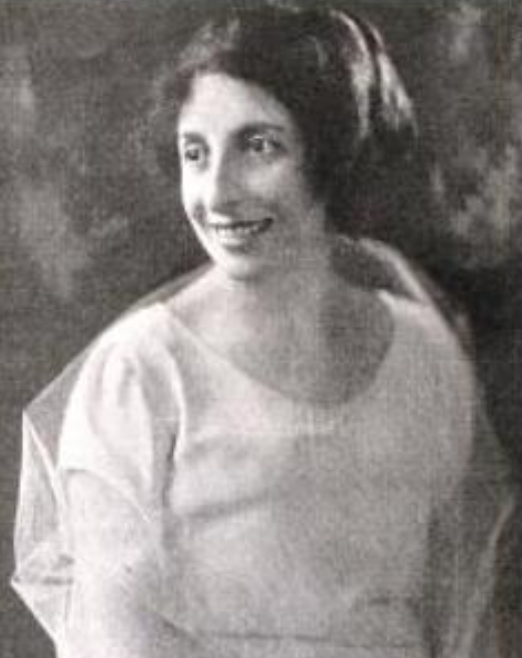
- Hanna Vollenhoven, from a 1923 publication
- Born: 1889; The Hague
- Died: 1972 (aged 82–83); United States
- Other names: Hanna van Vollenhoven Wolff, Mrs. Allen H. Vories Jr.
- Occupations: Composer, pianist

Hanna van Vollenhoven Vories (1889 – 1972) was a Dutch composer and pianist who moved to America in 1916. She is best remembered today for composing and performing music for player piano rolls, and for New York University's annual Hanna van Vollenhollen Fories Memorial Prize in Music. Her music was published under the name "Hanna Vollenhoven.

== Early life and education ==
Hanna van Vollenhoven Wolff was born in The Hague. Her father and grandfather were musicians, as was her brother Phillip. She studied music at the Amsterdam Conservatory with Julius Roentgen, Louis Coenan, Hugo Riemann, Bernard Zweers, and later with Alfred Cortot, and Leopold Godowsky.

== Career ==
Vollenhoven's European debut as a pianist was in 1909. In 1915, she visited America and made her American debut with the Chicago Symphony. Soon after, she withdrew from her position on the Netherlands Committee for Arts, Science, and Friendly Relations to pursue music full time in America.

Vollenhoven initially lived in Tarrytown, New York, while working in New York City. She played piano in Winthrop Ames' production of Pierrot the Prodigal and gave solo recitals, advertising performances of "modern and ulta-modern composers such as Chabrier, Debussy, Roger, Scriabine and Lambord" for her 1917–1918 season.

Vollenhoven composed and played at least two piano pieces for the De Luxe Reproducing Roll Corporation: The Thought of You and Viennese Waltz. She also played her composition Mon Reve, and possibly other pieces, for Welte Mignon piano rolls. In 1927, Vollenhoven and Vaughn De Leath (the "Radio Girl") recorded Vollenhoven's composition The Night Before Christmas for Edison Records (#52131). She also wrote "A Visit with Richard Pitrot", for the Musical Monitor in 1921, and a tribute to Leopold Godowsky for a New Jersey newspaper in 1938.

Her music was published by the Boston Music Company, Casa Ricordi, G. Schirmer Inc., and Winthrop Rogers Ltd (now Boosey & Hawkes).

== Compositions ==
Compositions by Hanna van Vollenhoven included an operetta, a cantata, and works for piano and voice.

=== Operetta ===
- Alice in Movieland

=== Piano ===
- Mon Reve (My Dream)
- Old Netherland Folksongs
- Thought of You
- Viennese Waltz

=== Vocal ===
- "Hear Me Speedily, O Lord"!
- "America We Sing to Thee" (1945)
- Hymn (for youth choir)
- "Joyous Meditation" (text by Gibbs Hofmann; music by Vollenhoven)
- "Love Me, I Love You" (text by Christina Rossetti; music by Vollenhoven)
- "(The) Night Before Christmas" (text by Clement Clarke Moore; piano accompaniment by Vollenhoven; sheet music illustrated by Grace Drayton)
- "Songs" (text by George Edward Woodberry; music by Vollenhoven)
- Star of the Renaissance: A Vision (cantata; text by Ray Bridgman; music by Vollenhoven)

== Personal life and legacy ==
Hanna van Vollenhoven married artist and singer Allen Hamilton Vories Jr. in 1933. They lived in Weehawken, New Jersey, and sometimes performed together. They had a son, David, who was also a musician. She was a church organist in New Jersey. New York University gives an annual Hanna van Vollenhollen Vories Memorial Prize in Music to a senior-year student majoring in music.
