= Frederikke Aspöck =

Danish film director (born 1974)

- Born: August 12, 1974 (age 51)
- Occupation: film director
- Relatives: Godfred Hartmann (grandfather)

Frederikke Aspöck is a Danish film director. She is a granddaughter of Godfred Hartmann.

She graduated in Set Design from the Wimbledon School of Art in London, then in 2004 obtained a master's degree in filmmaking from New York University's Tisch School of the Arts. While studying in NY, she wrote and directed four short films: Footsteps (1999), The Browns (2000), Lion-Tamer (2001), and Happy Now (2004), her thesis at Tisch. It brought her international recognition by winning the First Prize Cinéfondation at Cannes Film Festival.

== Selected filmography ==
- Happy Now — short, 2004; First Prize Cinéfondation in Cannes;
- Sheep (Danish: Får) — short, 2008;
- Moving on (short, 2011);
- Out of Bounds (Danish: Labrador) — debut feature, 2012; special screening in Cannes and won the Grand Prize at the Marrakech Film Festival;
- Rosita (feature, 2015) — Best Director at the Moscow Film Festival;
- Out of Tune (Danish: De frivillige) — feature, 2019; selected for both Rotterdam and Göteborg Film Festival;
- Empire (Danish: Viften) — feature, 2023; Nordic Council Film Prize.
