= Amanda Röntgen-Maier =

Swedish musician (1853–1894)

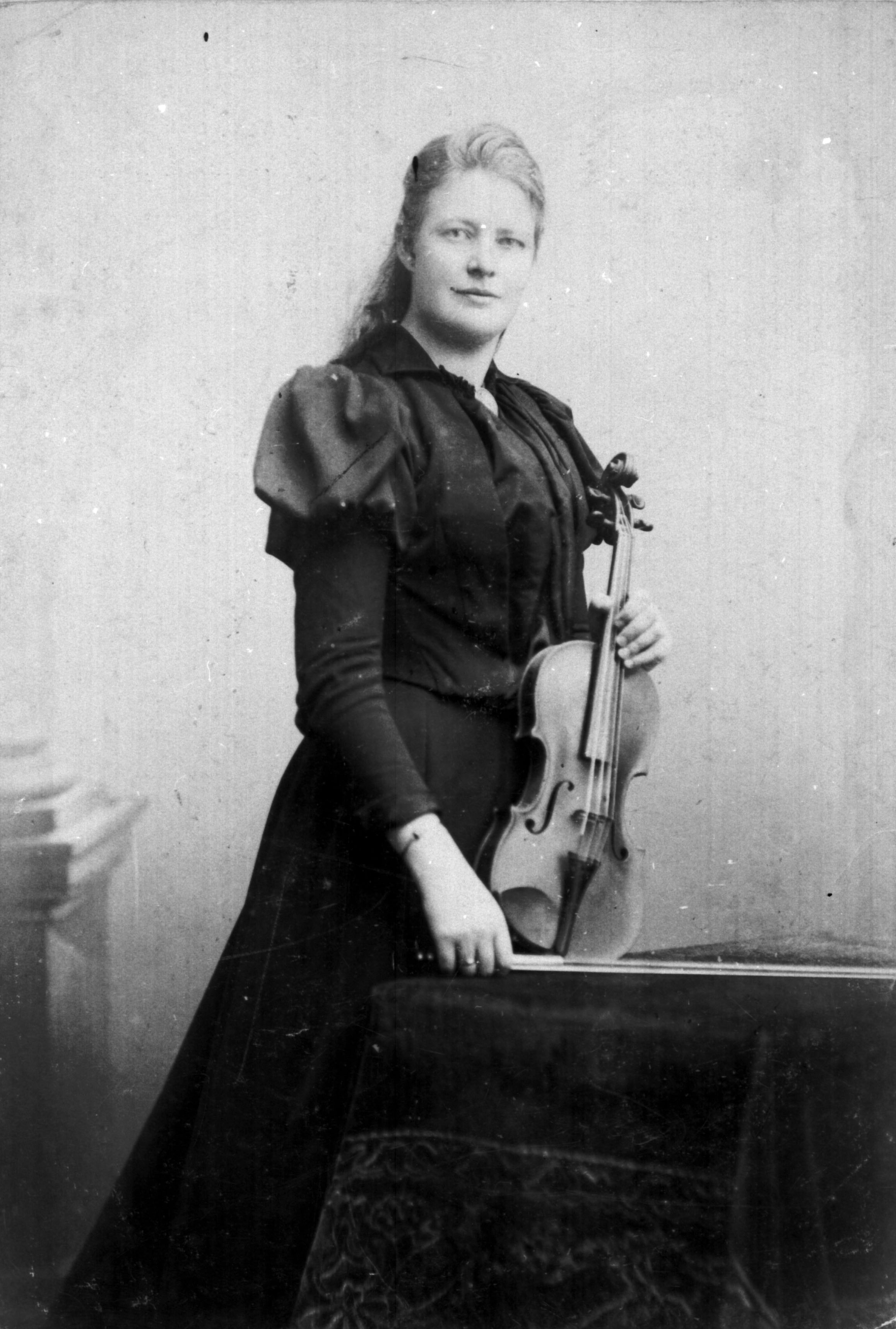
Amanda Röntgen-Maier

Amanda Röntgen-Maier (20 February 1853 – 15 July 1894) was a Swedish violinist and composer. She was the first female to graduate with the title "Musikdirectör" from the Royal College of Music in Stockholm in 1873.

== Biography ==
Amanda Maier was born into a musical home in Landskrona and discovered her musical talent early. Her first instruction in violin and piano was from her father. At the age of sixteen (1869), Maier began studying at the Royal College of Music in Stockholm, where she studied violin, organ, piano, cello, composition and harmony.

After graduation, she continued to study composition with the conservatory teachers Reinecke and Richter in Leipzig and violin from Engelbert Röntgen, concert master at Gewandhaus Orchestra in the same city. During this time in Leipzig (1873-76) she composed a violin sonata, a piano trio and a violin concerto for orchestra. Her Violin Concerto in D Minor was premiered in Halle in 1875 with Maier as soloist and received good reviews. It was repeated on 8 February 1876 in Leipzig at the Gewandhaus with Carl Reinecke conducting, and again in Stockholm on 18 November 1876.

From 1876 to 1880, she went on three major concert tours. In the summer of 1876, she toured the south of Sweden with singer Louise Pyk (1849-1929) and pianist Augusta Kiellander (1855-1897). Later in 1878, she added opera singer Sven Wilhelm Lundvik (1844-1910) to the group as they toured the east coast of Sweden, parts of Norway, and finished down the west coast of Scandinavia. During these tours, she performed at some very famous places like the Kungliga Teatern (the Royal Opera) in Stockholm. She also performed in the presence of King Oscar II who was the King of Sweden and King of Norway at the time. From September to November 1879, she went on tour again with Louise Pyk and Augusta Kiellander. This tour brought the group through Finland to Russia then returning back through Finland and Sweden.

In the summer of 1879, in Leipzig, she got engaged the German-Dutch pianist and composer Julius Röntgen (1855–1932), her violin teacher's son. The couple married in 1880 in Landskrona and moved to Amsterdam. The marriage ended Amanda's public appearances, but she continued composing. The couple arranged musical salons and music performances in Europe, with audience members including Nina and Edvard Grieg, Anton Rubinstein, Joseph Joachim, Clara Schumann and Johannes Brahms. In the late 1870s Maier also met Ethel Smyth, who was studying in Leipzig. They became friends and continued corresponding until Maier's death.

The couple had two sons, Julius Engelbert Röntgen (1881-1951), who became a violinist, and Engelbert Röntgen (1886-1958), who became a cellist. In 1887 Röntgen-Maier became ill with pleurisy. During her illness, the couple stayed in Nice and Davos to receive treatment on her lungs and stay under medical supervision. In 1890 she returned to Amsterdam and resumed teaching music to her sons. Throughout the last years of her life, she went to Denmark, Sweden, and Norway with her family, friends, and other musicians. Her final major composition was the piano quartet in E minor on a trip to Norway in 1891. She died in 1894 in Amsterdam, the Netherlands.

The Swedish record label dB Productions has released four albums in a series of Amanda Maier's complete works. Excerpts can be found on Youtube.

== Works ==
Known works include:

=== Violin and Orchestra ===
- Violin Concerto in D minor (1875)

=== Voice and Piano ===
- The Evening Chime (1878)
- Song of the Sick Girl (1878)
- The Song (1878)
- Young Courage (1878)

=== Violin and Piano ===
- Swedish Melodies and Dances for Violin and Piano (1882)
- Six Pieces for Piano and Violin (Publisher: Breitkopf & Hartel, Leipzig, 1879)
- Sonata in B Minor for Violin and Piano (Composed in 1873, Publisher: Musikaliska Konstföreningen, Stockholm, 1878)

=== Piano ===
- 25 Preludes (1869)
- Piano Piece (1881)

=== Quartets ===
- Quartet for Piano, Violin, Viola, and Cello in E minor (1891)
- String Quartet in A major (1877 – completed by B. Tommy Andersson in 2018)

=== Piano Trio ===
- Trio for Piano, Violin, and Cello (1874)

=== Compositions in Collaboration with Julius Röntgen ===
- Swedish Airs and Dances for Violin and Piano (Publisher: Breitkopf & Härtel, Leipzig, 1882)
- Dialogues: Small Piano Pieces (Publisher: Breitkopf & Härtel, Leipzig, 1882)

== Legacy ==
In 2018 a string quartet was formed by members the Royal Stockholm Philharmonic Orchestra, and named the Maier Quartet. In June 2024, BBC Radio 3 featured Amanda Röntgen-Maier as 'Composer of the week'.
