= Johan Ernst Hartmann =

Danish organist and composer

Johan Ernst Hartmann (2 March 1770 – 16 December 1844) was a Danish organist and composer, and son of composer and violinist Johann Hartmann. In 1795, he started as an organist at Frederik's German Church in Christianshavn and in 1807 he became cantor at Roskilde Cathedral. Some of his compositions, including cantatas, were performed in the years 1789-97. At Roskilde, he established a renowned choir for which he composed various works .

He died on 16 December 1844. His son, Søren Hartmann (1815-1912), became his successor as cantor at Roskilde Cathedral, where he also stayed until 1883.
