= List of county governors of Møn =

This list of county governors of Vordingborg lists county governors (Danish: Amtmand) of Vordingborg County, Denmark.

== List ==
Portrait	Incumbent	Term	Notes
	Peder Reedtz	1657–1662	
	Vacant (Alex. Pe dersen Rumohrfung)	1657–1662	
	Jorgen Reedtz	1664–1671	
	Otto Krabbe	1671–1685	
	Samuel Christof, von Plessen	1685–1697	
	Christian Siegfried von Plessen	1697–1703	
	Caspar Gottlob Moltke	1703–1728	
	Johan Folkmar Tobias Hoffmann	1728–1730	
	Christopher Ulrik Lützow	1731–1733	
	Christopher Sigismund von Galkowsky	1734–1747	
	Frederik Christian von Møsting	1747–1773	
	Christopher Georg Wallmoden	1773–1783	
	Antoine de Bosc de la Calmette	1783–1803	
