= Engelbert Röntgen =

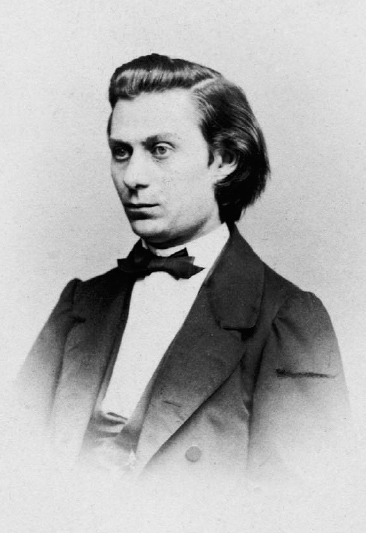
Engelbert Röntgen

Engelbert Röntgen (30 September 1829 – 12 December 1897) was a German violinist, for many years concertmaster of the Leipzig Gewandhaus Orchestra.

== Life ==
He was born in Deventer in the Netherlands, the son of Johann Röntgen, a German merchant, and his Dutch wife. He entered the Conservatorium der Musik at Leipzig in 1848, where he was a pupil of the violinist Ferdinand David.

In 1850 Röntgen became a member of the Leipzig Gewandhaus Orchestra, in 1869 the second concertmaster and in 1873 he took David's place as first concertmaster of the orchestra. He remained in the orchestra until his death in 1897. He was also a teacher in the Conservatorium.

In 1861 he acquired the Lipinski Stradivarius; the violin remained with Röntgen and his descendants for three generations.

=== Family ===
Röntgen married Friedericke Pauline Klengel, daughter of Moritz Klengel, himself concertmaster at the Gewandhaus for many years. They had a son and two daughters; their son Julius Röntgen became a pianist and composer.
