= Johan Messchaert =

Dutch opera baritone and voice teacher (1857–1922)

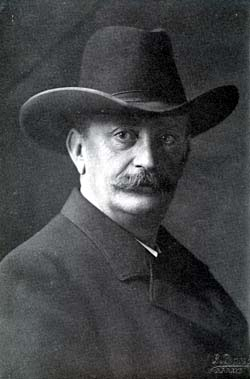
Johan Messchaert, 1910

Johan Messchaert (22 August 1857 – 9 September 1922) was a Dutch baritone singer and vocal pedagogue.

Messchaert was born as Johannes Martinus Messchaert in Hoorn, Netherlands. He was known for his rendering of the role of Christ in J. S. Bach's St Matthew Passion, and he sang the bass role at the 18 May 1902 Düsseldorf performance of Edward Elgar's The Dream of Gerontius under the direction of Julius Buths and alongside Muriel Foster.

He later founded his own conservatoire in Amsterdam.

He died in Küsnacht, Switzerland, in 1922, aged 65.
