= Tony Fretton =

British architect (born 1945)

Anthony Fretton OBE (born 17 January 1945) is a British architect known for his residential and public gallery buildings, as well as other British and international design work. He graduated from the Architectural Association (AA) and worked for various practices including Arup, Neyland and Ungless, and Chapman Taylor, before setting up his own firm, Tony Fretton Architects, in 1982. His first major project was the Lisson Gallery in 1990. He is known for designing "location sensitive art spaces" using a combination of vernacular and minimalist approaches balancing new and age-old designs.

From 1999 to 2013, Tony Fretton held the post of Professor within the Chair of Architecture and Interiors at TU Delft, the Netherlands.

== Projects ==
- Lisson Gallery, Marylebone, London (1990)
- Sway Centre, Hampshire (1996)
- The Quay Arts Centre on the Isle of Wight (1998)
- Red House, Chelsea for Alex Sainsbury (2001)
- Camden Arts Centre, London (2004)
- Faith House and Artists Studios, Holton Lee Centre for Disability, Poole Dorset (2002 - 2005)
- British Embassy, Warsaw (2009)

The £27m embassy, has earned plaudits "despite being built on a second-choice site, and squeezed by budget constraints caused by the strengthening of the zloty against the pound" includes Belgian marble facing the entrance and a glazed outer façade that "is actually a brilliantly refined blast-screen".

- Anish Kapoor's house Chelsea, London
- Vassal Road Housing
- Fuglsang Art Museum. Lolland, Denmark (2008)

Fretton's design for Faith House at Holton Lee in Dorset is "a quiet space for contemplation" in the spirit a poor village church. It was made with cedar, glass and birch for £150,000 and was described as "a modern temple providing a still point in a turning world."
