= Fuglsang Art Museum =

Coordinates: 54.7231°N 11.7997°E

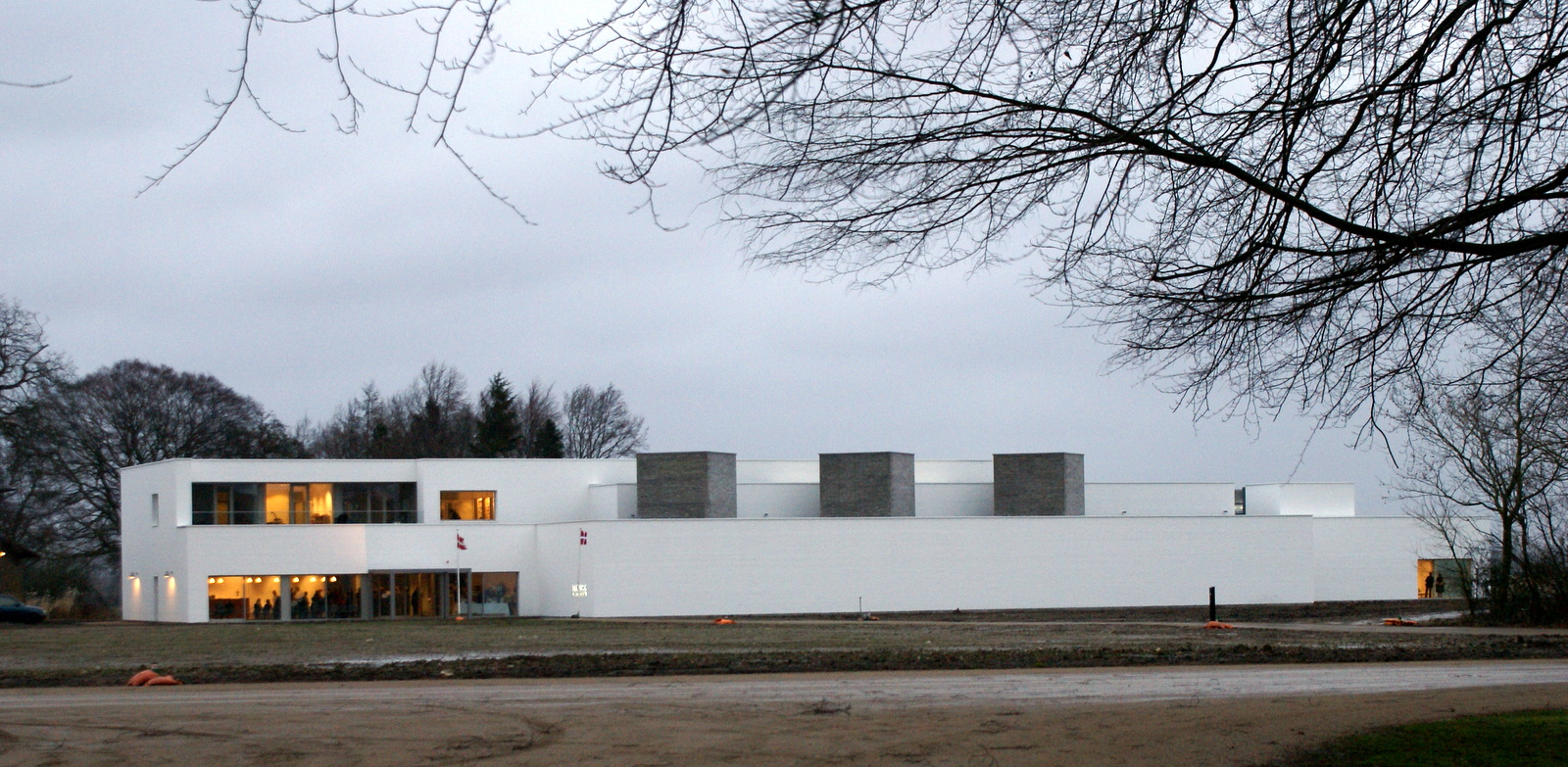
- Established: 2008
- Location: Lolland, Denmark
- Type: Art museum
- Website: www.fuglsangkunstmuseum.dk

Fuglsang Art Museum (Danish: Fuglsang Kunstmuseum) is an art museum set in rural surroundings in Guldborgsund Municipality on the island of Lolland in Denmark. It is part of the Fuglsang Cultural Centre. The museum features Danish art with an emphasis on artists and motifs of local provenance.

The museum is located in a purpose-built building, designed by Tony Fretton. Noted for its integration with the surrounding architecture and landscape, the museum building won a 2009 RIBA European Award and was short-listed for the Stirling Prize the same year.

== History ==
An architecture competition for the design of a building was won by Tony Fretton in May 2005. Construction started in August 2006 and the museum was inaugurated in January 2008.

== Building ==
The Fuglsang Art Museum is located in a whitewashed, modernistic building, designed to fit into the existing architecture of the Fuglsang estate and the surrounding landscape.

The galleries are arranged around a long corridor which itself serves as a significant exhibition space. At the end of the corridor is a small room with three large windows, one of which is slightly offset from the axis and visible from the corridor. With no artworks displayed, it is entirely dedicated to contemplation and viewing of the exterior landscape.

On one side of the corridor are fairly small galleries with gold ornaments inspired by the architecture of the adjoining Fuglsang manor house. These are dedicated to smaller scale works. On the other side of the corridor are larger toplit galleries.

== Collections ==
The museum houses a notable collection of Danish art ranging from the end of the 18th century to the current day and includes paintings, sculptures and sketches. The collection has an emphasis on local artists and motifs.

=== Paintings ===
The museum holds approximately 500 paintings, with a few dating from the late 18th century and the Danish Golden Age during the first half of the 19th century, while the main focus of the collection is on paintings from around 1900. Represented are important Danish artists like the Skagen Painters, the Fynboerne, Theodor Philipsen, L. A. Ring, Oluf Hartmann and Vilhelm Hammershøi.

=== Sculpture ===
The collection features around 199 sculptures, dating from the late 19th century to 1950. The main emphasis is on the period 1930-50.

=== Works on paper ===
The museum's extensive collection of drawings, watercolours and particularly graphic works are mainly from the 20th century.

== Exhibitions and other activities ==
Fuglsang Art Museum has regular shows of its works and arranges several special exhibitions annually. Moreover, the shows and special exhibitions are complemented with a diverse programme of arrangements and presentations. There is also an interdisciplinary school service attached to the museum.
