= Fuglsang (manor) =

Manor house in Lolland, Denmark

Coordinates: 54.7219°N 11.7977°E

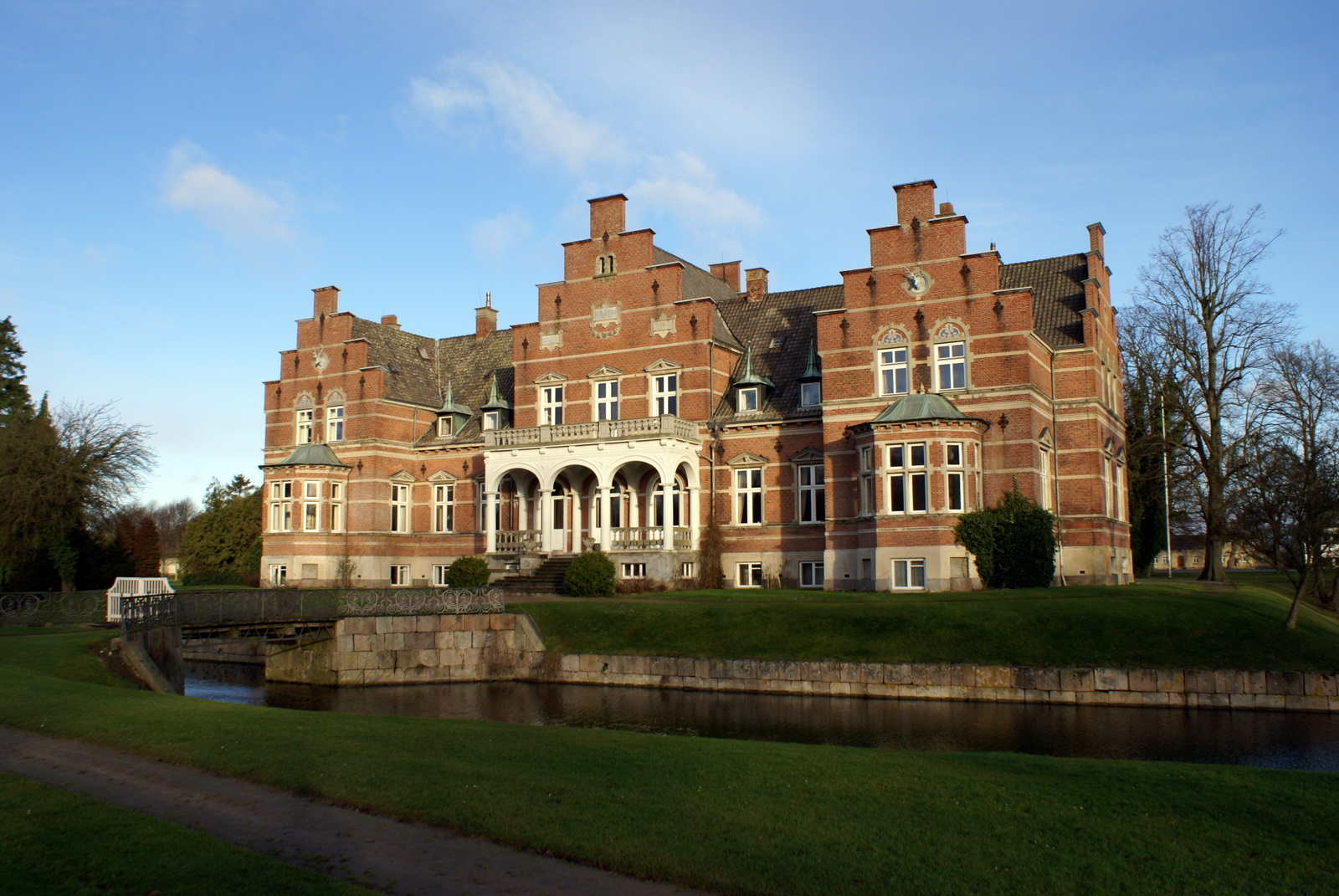
- Fuglsang Manor House

General information
- Architectural style: Historicism
- Location: Lolland, Denmark
- Construction started: 1868
- Completed: 1869
- Owner: Det Classenske Fideicommis

Design and construction
- Architect: J. G. Zinn

Fuglsang is a 19th-century manor house now operated by Det Classenske Fideicommis as a cultural centre as an active agricultural estate at Toreby on the island of Lolland, in southeastern Denmark. The estate was owned by members of the de Neergaard family from 1819 to 1947.

Today, the main building serves as a venue for classical concerts and other cultural activities. The cultural centre also includes Fuglsang Art Museum, located in a purpose-built building designed by British architect Tony Fretton. The Fuglsang/Priorskov Estate has 1,731 hectares of land. It is managed as an active agricultural estate by a trust.

== History ==
=== Early history ===
The history of the estate can be tracked back to 1368. The original fortified castle was located a few hundred metres further north, where remains can still be seen. The location at the edge of marshland where Flintinge Stream mouths in the Guldborgsund Strait, close to the only ford in the area, has made it of strategic importance in the area.

In the 16th century, Fuglsang was moved to its current location on a larger islet, surrounded by broad moats. This building was demolished in 1849 and replaced by a Neoclassical main building. The park, still seen today, was also founded at this event.

Rolf Viggo de Neergaard took over the property from his parents in 1866, but due to fungal attacks on the timber, the only 26-year-old building had to be demolished. The current building was built from 1868-69 to the design of his cousin architect Jens G. Zinn who has also designed several buildings at the Holmen Naval Base in Copenhagen.

=== Artist's retreat ===
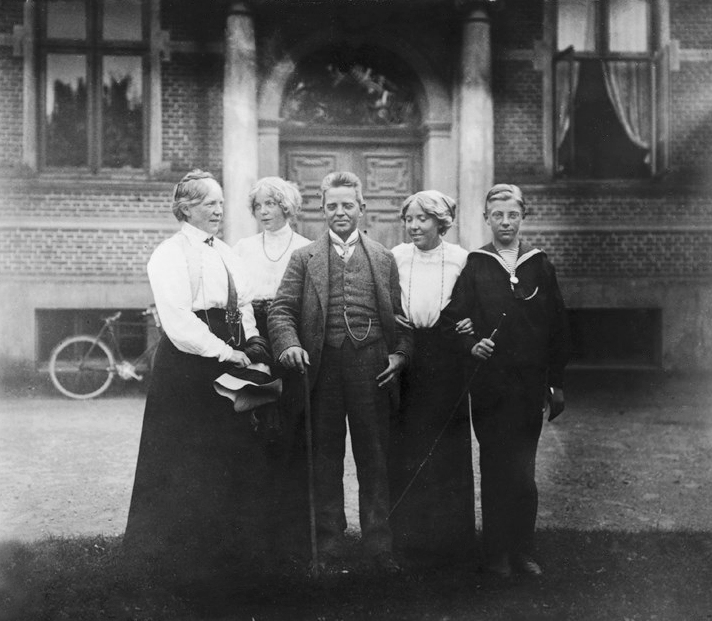
Carl Nielsen and family at Fuglsang

In 1885, de Neergaard married his cousin Bodil Neergaard, and together they opened the house to a large number of visiting artists and particularly musicians. Both the Norwegian composer Edvard Grieg and the Danish composer Carl Nielsen were frequent visitors to the house and close friends of the couple.

Upon her husband's death in 1915, Bodil Neergaard managed the large estate alone, and organized the social and church life of the household. In 1947, she bequested the estate to a trust, providing that her home and garden should be made a retreat upon her death. After her death in 1959, Refugiet Fuglsang was founded in 1962 and served as a retreat for artists and other people of note until it had to close in 1995. The following year a local musical society was founded, arranging 9 annual concerts. Since 1997, the Storstrøm Chamber Ensemble has been based at Fuglsang.

In January 2008, Fuglsang Art Museum opened in a purpose-built building close to the Fuglsang main building.

== Interior ==
The music room is very large and known for its exceptional acoustics. Next to it, the Agnethe Room (Danish: Agnethestuen), features a fresco representing a scene from the Danish folk tale Agnete og Havmanden (lit. 'Agnete and the Merman'). The painting was created by the painter Axel Viggo Wørmer.

Wørmer has also created the Pompeian decorations in the Fuglsang's library. The library is the former billiard room. The billiard table is now located in the Prime Minister's summer residence Marienborg.

== List of owners ==
- Laurids Nielsen Kabel, 1403
- Axel Andersen Mule, 1423–1440
- Mette Jensdatter Due, –1446
- Maribo Kloster, 1446–1457
- Oluf Andersen Gøye, 1457–1477
- Cecilie Pedersdatter, married 1) Gøye, 2) Venstermand, 1477–
- Johan Venstermand, 1480–1492
- Sophie Olufsdatter Gøye, married Venstermand, 1477–1507
- Henning Venstermand, 1494–1506
- Erik Clausen Neb, 1509–1510
- Birgitte Clausdatter Bølle née Daa
- Mads Eriksen Bølle, –1539
- Dorte Madsdatter Rud née Bølle, 1539–
- Knud Jørgensen Rud, –1554
- Erik Knudsen Rud, 1554–1577
- Peder Eriksen Rud, 1577–1592
- Knud Eriksen Rud, 1577–1611
- Corfitz Eriksen Rud, 1577–1630
- Helvig Corfitzdatter Krabbe née Rud, 1630
- Gregers Krabbe, 1630–1645
- Vibeke Gregersdatter Daa née Krabbe, 1645
- Christen Daa, 1645–1661
- Queen Sophie Amalie, 1661–1685
- The Crown, 1685–1726
- Christian Carl Gabel, 1726–1726
- Abraham Lehn, 1726–1757
- Catharina Margaretha Wallmoden née Lehn, 1757–1759
- Christopher Georg Wallmoden, 1759–1793
- Friedrich von Wallmoden, 1793–1819
- Peter Johansen Neergaard, 1819–1835
- Johan Ferdinand Petersen Neergaard, 1835–1849
- Charlotte Louise Elisabeth Neergaard, 1849–1866
- Viggo Johansen Neergaard, 1866–1915
- Bodil Neergaard, 1915–1947
- Det Classenske Fideicommis, 1947–present

== Gallery ==
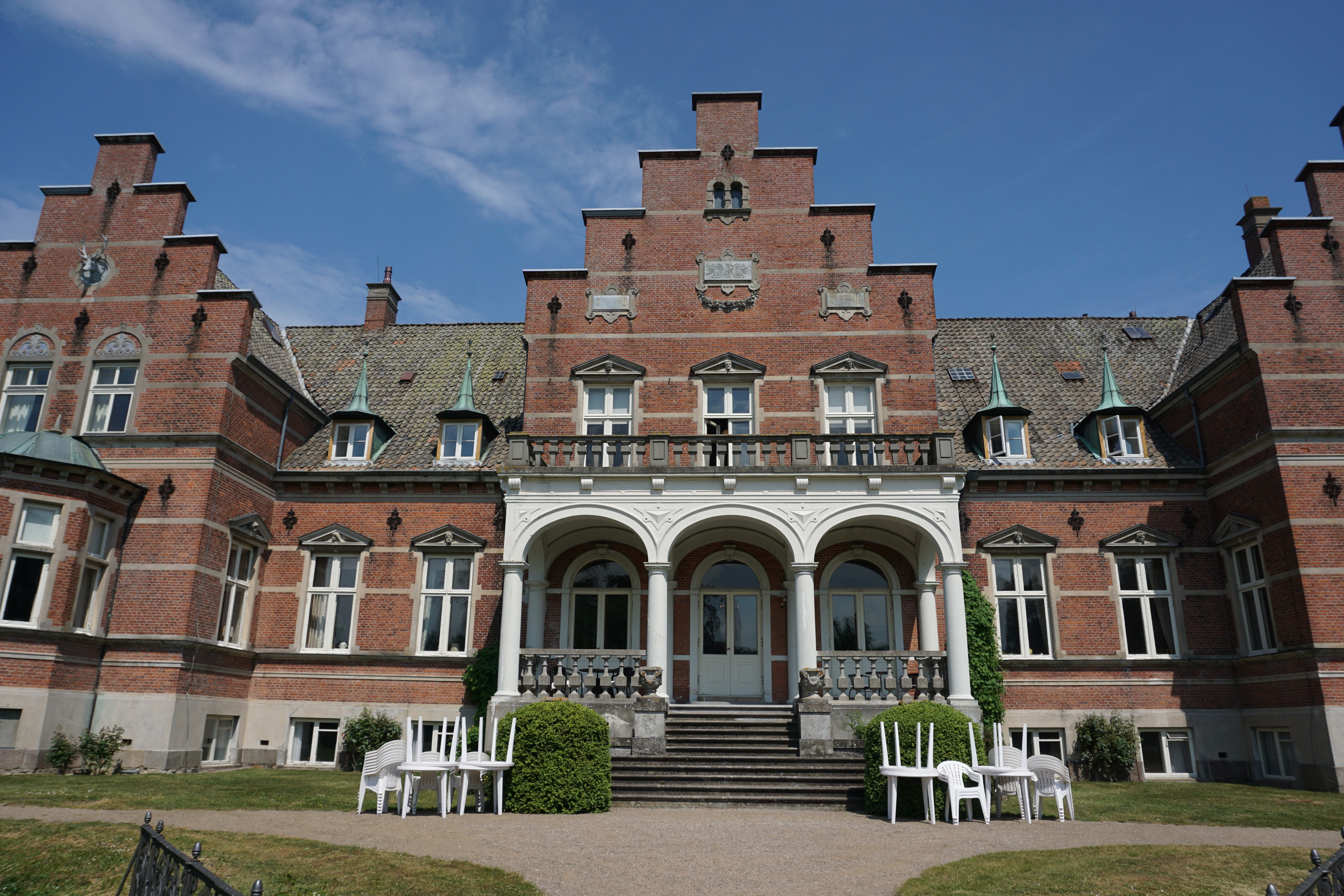
Entrance

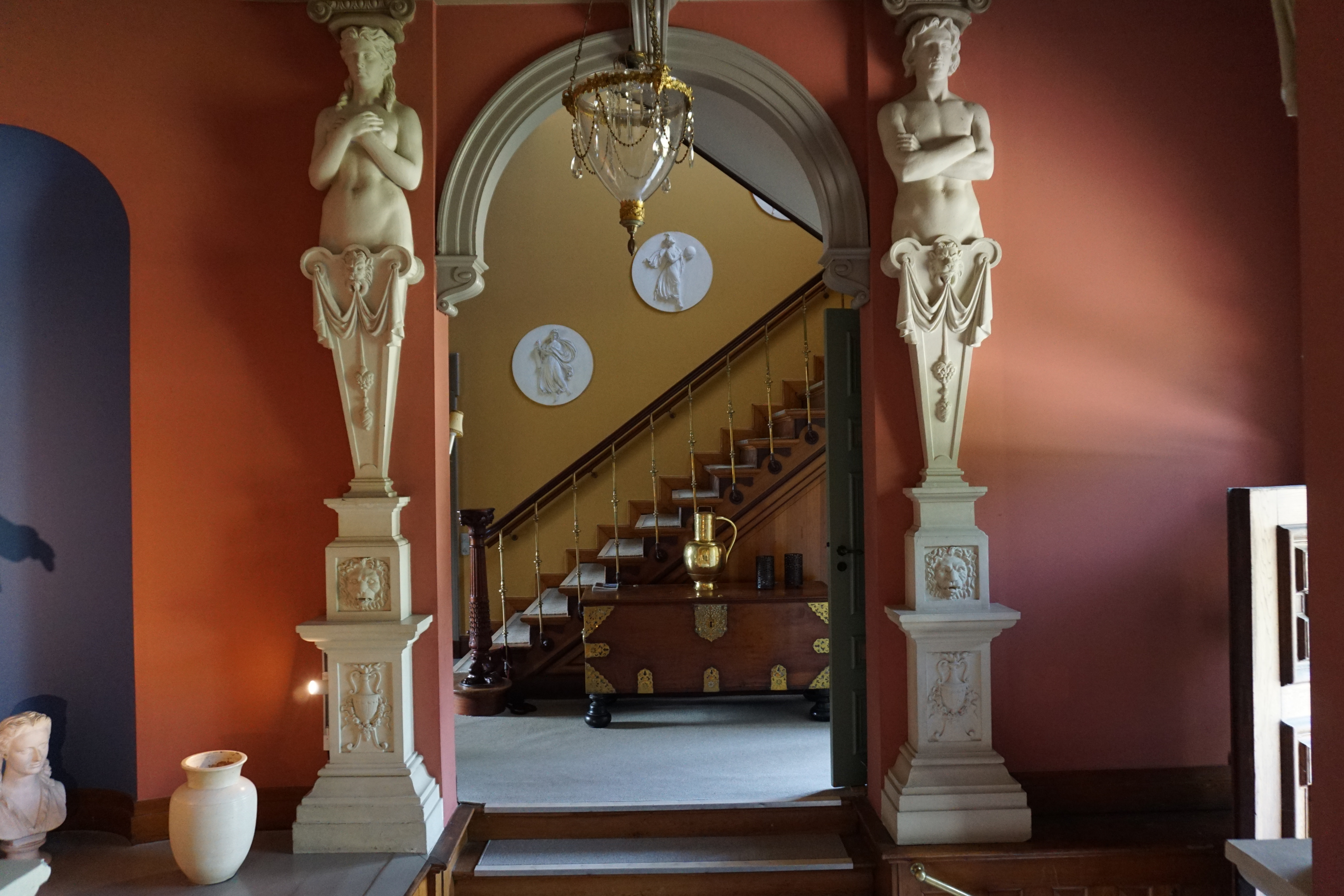
Interior

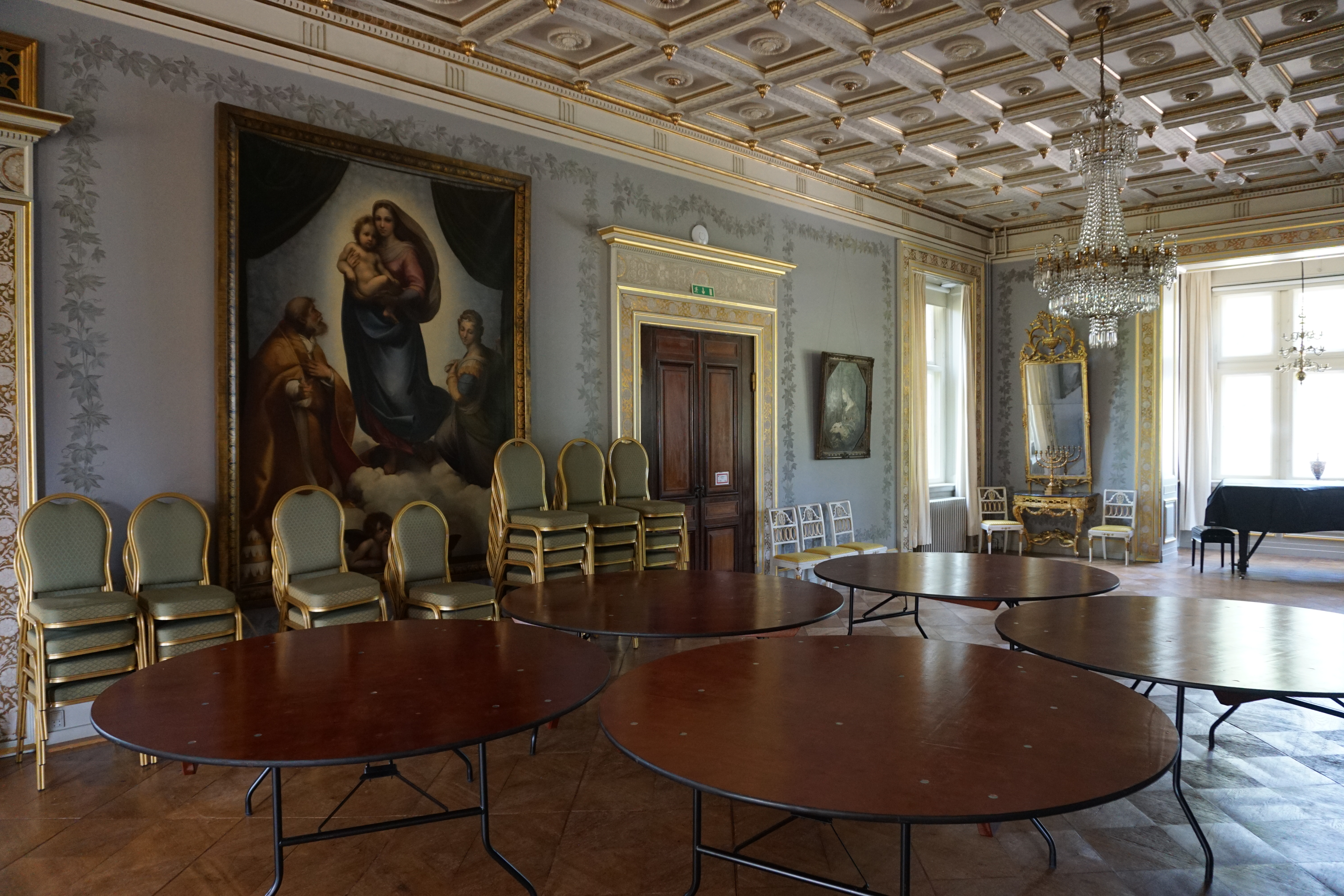
Interior

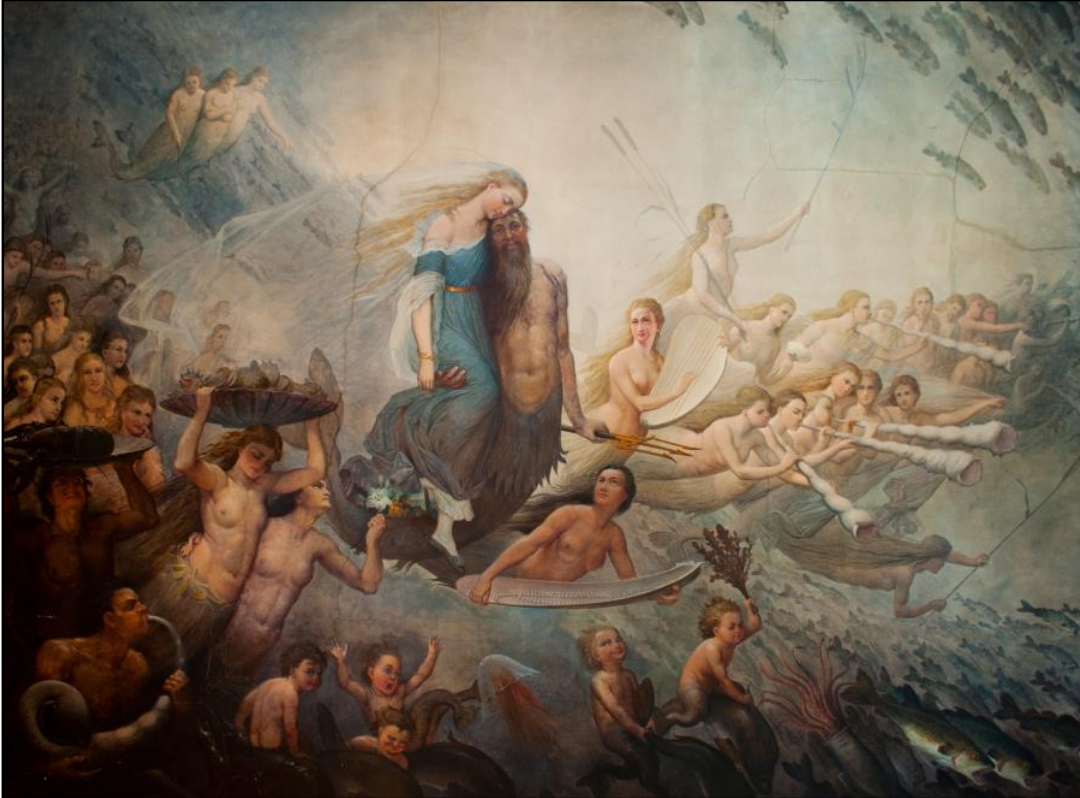
The Agnethe og Havmanden ceiling
