= Kompagnistræde 9 =

Property in Copenhagen, Denmark

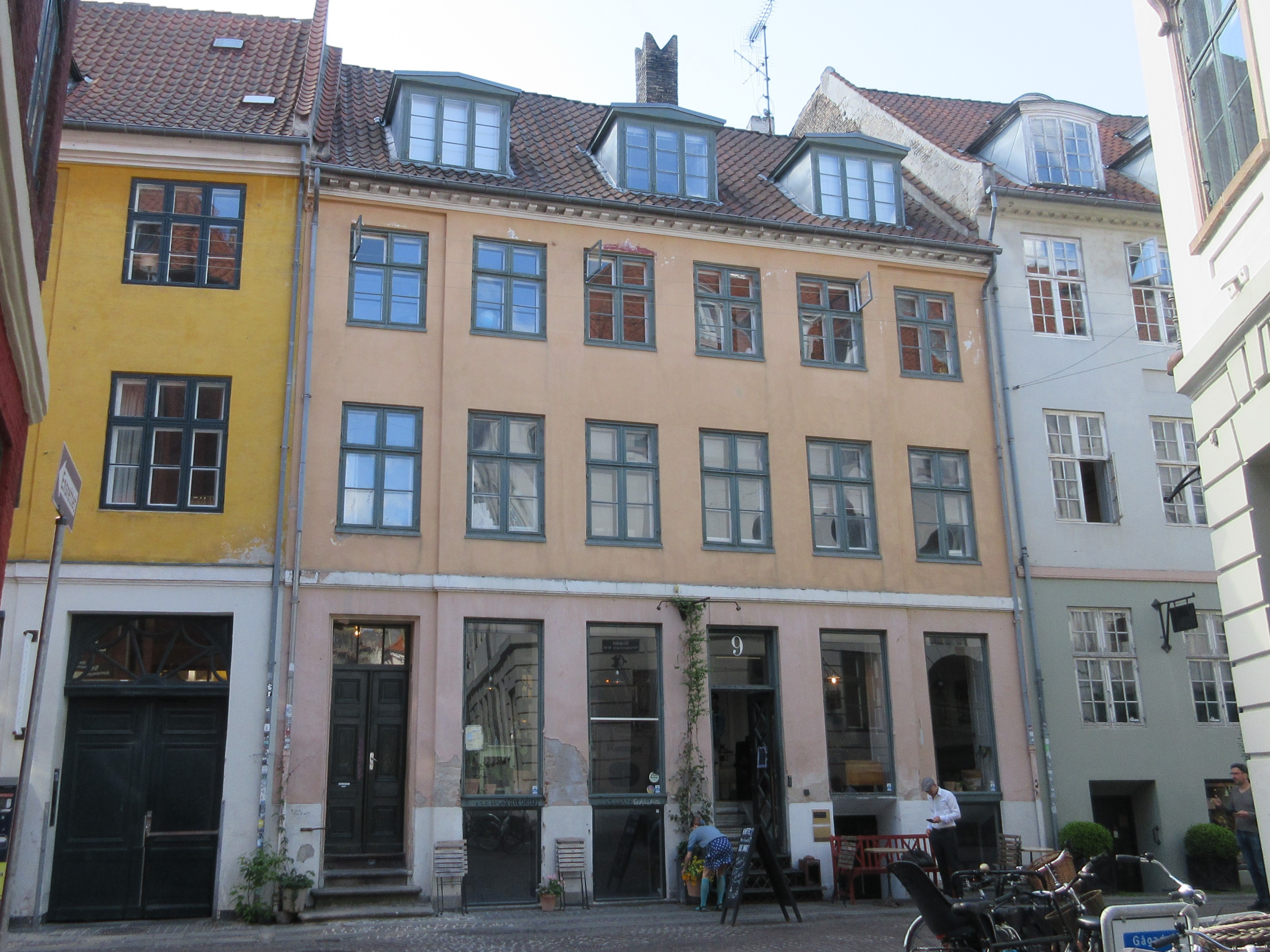
- Interactive map of the Kompagnistræde 9 area

General information
- Location: Copenhagen, Denmark
- Coordinates: 55°40′38.78″N 12°34′34.61″E
- Completed: 1796–1797

Kompagnistræde 9 is a property situated on Strædet, between Naboløs and Knabrostræde, roughly opposite Badstuestræde, in the Old Town of Copenhagen, Denmark. Like most of the other buildings in the area, the building was constructed as part of the rebuilding of the city following the Copenhagen Fire of 1795. It was listed in the Danish registry of protected buildings and places in 1945.

== History ==
=== 18th century ===
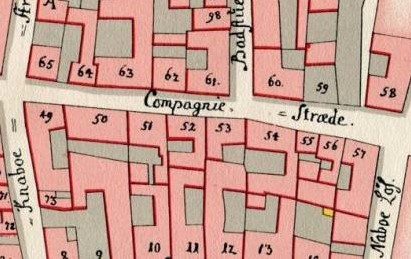
No. 53 seen on a detail from Christian Gedde's map of Snaren's Quarter, 1757.

The property was listed as No. 56 in Snaren's Quarter in 1689 and owned by Henrik Schrøder. By 1756, it was listed as No. 53 and owned by goldsmith Andreas Jacob Rudolph.

At the time of the 1787 census, No. 53 was owned by Hans Christian Knudsen, archivist of the Danish Chancery. He was living on the site with his wife Benedicta Sophia Frich. two sons, a foster daughter, and three maids. The elder of their two sons was civil servant Christian Knudsen. The property was also home to two more households. Isack Ludvig Dems, bookkeeper for a merchant named Cramer, resided in another dwelling with his wife Maria Elisabeth, their three children (aged one to five) and two maids. Niels Gerløv, a cavalrist in the Holstein Regiment, resided in a third dwelling with his wife Ellen Kirstine and their four children (aged 6 to 19).

Hans Christian Knudsen and his wife would later (1801 census) rent an apartment in master baker Peder Loi's property on the other side of the street (now Kompagnistræde 10).

Together with most of the other buildings in the area, the building was destroyed in the Copenhagen Fire of 1795. The current building on the site was built in 1796–1797 by plasterer and master mason Carl Claus Jennerich.

=== 19th century ===
At the time of the 1801 census, the property was home to a total of 20 people distributed among four households. One of them consisted of plasterer Carl Jennerich, his apprentice Friderich Lund and two lodgers. Another household consisted of beer vendor (øltapper) Niels Lund, his wife, their one-year-old son Gabriel Lund and two lodgers. The third household consisted of grocer Rosine Nathan, her three children (aged eight to sixteen), maid Lovise Sonberg and lodger Jol Philip. The fourth household consisted of tailor Andreas Brenstrup and his wife Marie Larsen, their six-year-old granddaughter Andrine Brenstrup, 13-year-old tailor's apprentice Johan Peter and maid Gunild Andersdatter.

The property was again listed as No. 56 in the new cadastre of 1806. It was owned by N. Lauritzen & Hvidt at the time. The basement was converted into a shop space in 1937 and the same was done to the ground floor in 1846.

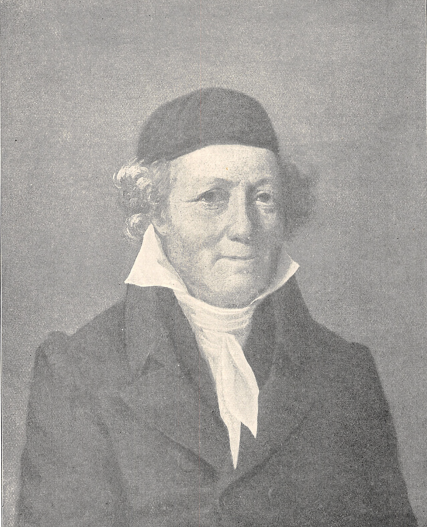
Samuel Joseph Levin

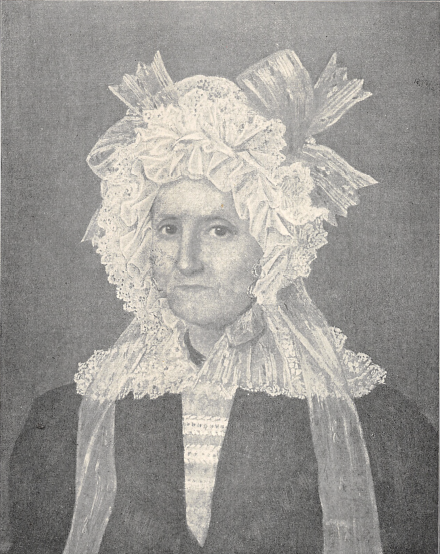
Birgitte Levin, née Heymann

The property was home to 18 residents at the 1940 census. Fridrich Wulff Heilbuth, a merchant, resided on the second floor with his wife Bolette née Larsen, their eight children (aged 5 to 25), theology student Niels Schaugaard and maid Birthe Larsdatter. The residents of the first floor were beer vendor (øltapper) Jens Erichsen and his lodger Hans Ahrentzen (joiner), grocer Samuel Joseph Levin and his wife Birgitte née Heiman, and watchmaker Dorthe Magdalene Behren. Samuel and Birgitte Levin had only lived in the apartment on the first floor since 1839. They celebrated their gold anniversary in the apartment 30 October 1840. Birgitte Levin died on 16 January 1851 and Samuel Levin moved shortly thereafter to M. E. Ruben's property at Løvstræde 12.

The building fronting the street was home to just nine people at the time of the 1860 census. Jens Christian Lund, a 33-year-old former master baker, resided in one of the apartments with Henriette Christine née Bonsen, his illegitimate daughter Ana Magrethe Lund and the maid Johanne Sophie Hansen. Edvard Ferdinand Løser, a master plumber, resided in the other apartment with his wife Marie Løser née Fegneschou, their widowed daughter-in-law Josephine Løser Hapff and her two-year-old daughter Edvard Ferdinand Løser and maid Christine Hansen.

=== 20th century ===
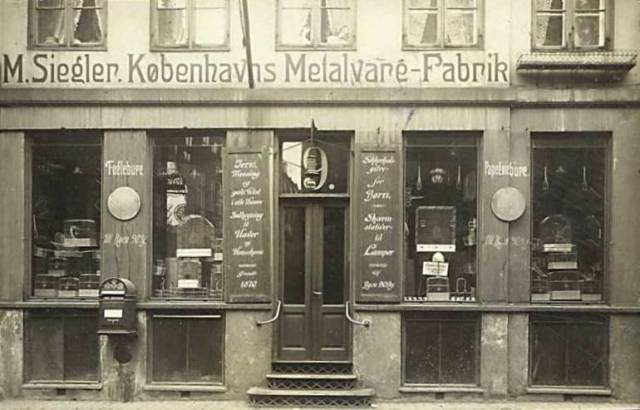
M. Siegler – Københavns Metalvare-Fabrik

København's Metaltraadvarefabrik & Fortinneri, a manufacturer of metal goods founded on 2 September 1870 by William Siegler (1841–1890), was based in the building for many years. It was later continued by the founder's sister Marie Siegler (1836–1918) and later by V. A. T. Siegler and C. de Blanck. V. A. T. Siegler left the firm in 1919 and from then on it was continued with C. de Blanck (1885–1949) as the sole owner. Upon his death, it was continued by his daughter and son Grethe and Edvard de Blanck. The firm was based in the building until at least the 1950s.

H. Mortensen's Eftf., E. Møller, a combined watch shop and furniture retailer, was from 1937 also based in the building. The firm was founded by Geltzer and Stilhof in 1876 and was originally based at Gammel Strand 32; it was taken over by H. Mortensen (1850–1911). In November 1911, it was taken over by E. Møller (born 1864). It was based at Kompagnistræde 9 until at least the 1950s.

Søe-Jensen & Co. has also operated a shop in the basement.

== Architecture ==
Kompagnistræde 9 is constructed in brick with three storeys over a walk-out basement and is six bays wide with slightly recessed outer bays. The plastered facade is below a white belt course sand coloured on the ground floor and yellow with green painted windows below a modillioned cornice on the upper floors. The facade was originally finished with shadow joints on the ground floor, a hood mould supported by corbels above the basement entrance, a recessed band with rosette decorations above the ground floor, a Greek key frieze above the four central windows and accented windows in the outer bays on the first floor. The current solution with a plastered facade dates from 1866. The pitched roof is clad with red tiles. The three dormer windows towards the street date from 1846. A perpendicular wing with a monopitched red tile roof extends from the rear side of the building along one side of a small courtyard. The facades of both wings towards the yard are plastered and painted yellow.

== Today ==
The property was owned by Woodlands I APS as of 2007. Kompa’ 9, a coffee shop, is based on the ground floor of the building.
