= Frello =

Frello is a surname, may refer to:

- Jorge Luiz Frello Filho (born 1991), better known for his stage name Jorginho, Brazil-born Italian international footballer with Italians ancestry
- Otto Frello (1924–2015), Danish painter, graphic artist, cartoonist and illustrator
