= Brolæggerstræde 2 =

Apartment building in Copenhagen, Denmark

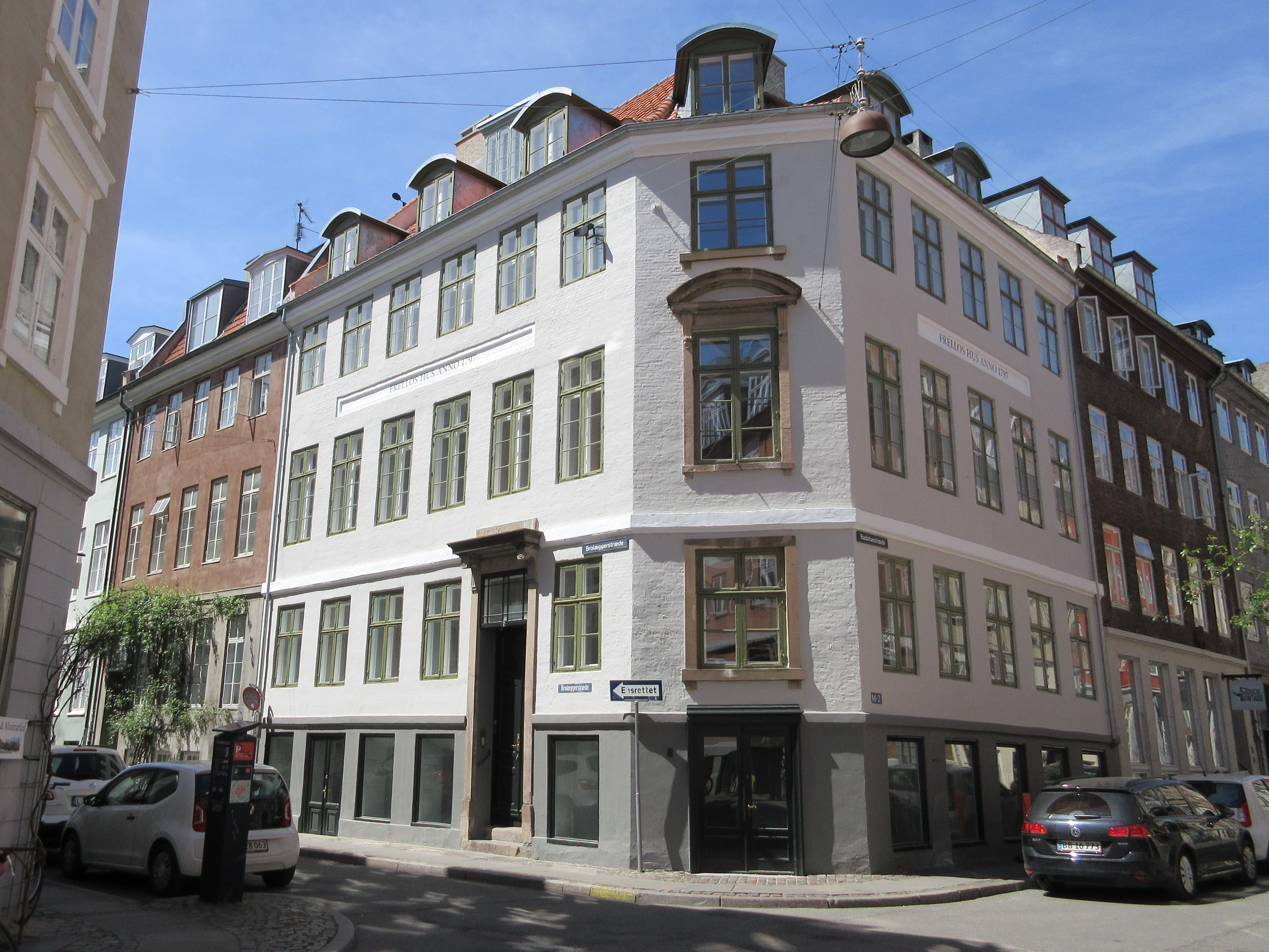
- The building seen from Badstuestræde
- Interactive map of the Brolæggerstræde 2 area

General information
- Architectural style: Neoclassical
- Location: Copenhagen, Denmark
- Coordinates: 55°40′40.6″N 12°34′30.8″E
- Completed: 1797
- Owner: For the Grethe Foss

Brolæggerstræde 2 is a four-storey apartment building situated at the corner of Brolæggerstræde and Badstuestræde in the Old Town of Copenhagen, Denmark. The building was listed on the Danish registry of protected buildings and places in 1950. Otto Frello, who owned it from 1966 until his death, painted a trompe-l'œil mural of a door on the first floor.

== History ==
=== 18th century ===
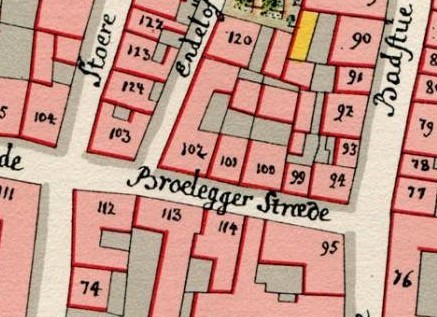
No. 93, No. 94 and No. 99 seen on Gedde's district map of Snaren's Quarter from 1757

The site was in the late 17th century made up of two separate properties. One of them was listed in Copenhagen's first cadastre of 1689 as No. 115 in Snaren's Quarter and belonged to turner Johan Trimand. The other one was listed as No. 116 and belonged to turner Christen Treiner. The two properties were both destroyed in the Copenhagen Fire of 1728, together with most of the other buildings in the area. The fire sites were subsequently divided into three properties. The small corner property was listed in the new cadastre of 1756 as No 94 and belonged to Lars Bøgvadt at that time. The adjacent property in Badstuestræde was listed as No. 93 in Snaren's Quarter and belonged to Mathias Hansen at that time. The adjacent property in Brolæggerstræde was listed as No. 99 and belonged to chairmaker Jacob Jensen Lindholm.

The three properties were again destroyed in the Copenhagen Fire of 1795 and subsequently merged into a single property. The current building on the site was constructed in 1797 for tea merchant Knud Steenberg. Stenberg ran a tea shop from the walk-out basement.

=== 19th century ===
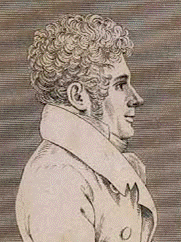
Peter Thun Foersom

No. 93 was home to a total of 32 residents in seven households. Ludolfine Frideriche Lillie, a tea and coffee merchant, resided in the building with her 11-year-old grandson Knud Magnus Steenberg. Peder Schive, a clockmaker, resided in the building with his wife Anna Henriette Schrøder, their one-year-old son Jacob Svend Schive and one maid. Abraham Joseph Cohen and Susanne Jacoba Bærentz, a Jewish couple, resided in the building with a five-year-old son from the husband's first marriage, a 25-year-old son from the wife's first marriage, two maids and two lodgers. Peter Foersom and Hanne Cathrine Ebbesen, both of them actors at the Royal Danish Theatre, resided in the building with their two daughters (aged one and four). Hanne Cathrine Ebbesen's mother, Cathrine Margrethe Ebbesen. was also a resident of the building. Lazarus Abraham Levi, a secondhand clothing retailer, resided in the building with his wife Mette Levi, their four children (aged five to 10), two lodgers and one maid. Peter Larsen Holm, a smith at the Royal Naval Dockyards, resided in the basement with his wife Else Andersdatter and their eight-year-old daughter Marie Holm.

The property was listed in the new cadastre of 1806 as No. 122 in Snaren's Quarter. It was owned by tea merchant Johan Lohrenz at that time.

No. 122 was home to a total of 35 residents at the 1840 census. Hans Christian Voldenberg Truelsen, a royal clerk (kgl. copiist), resided on the ground floor with his wife Albertine Frederikke Møller and the 15-year-old Christiane Thunboe who was receiving private tutoring. Carl Nicolai Buchleister and Henriette Lassen, a couple living on their means, resided in the other ground-floor apartment with their three children (aged 10 to 15) and one maid. Peder Wulff Ramus, an assistant in Danmarks Nationalbank, resided on the first floor with his wife Margrethe Dyrborg and a 21-year-old servant. Louise Dorthea Dannefeldt, a 32-year-old unmarried needleworker, resided in the other first-floor apartment with a maid and a lodger. Georg Martin Halvor Schmidt, a captain on paid leave, resided in one of the second-floor apartments with his wife Frederike Catharine, their two children and a 21-year-old student lodger. Niels Nymann, a master tailor, resided in the other second-floor apartment with his wife Ane Andersen, their five-year-old daughter Therisia Nymann and the wife's 80-year-old uncle Peter Andersen. Lars Petersen, a grocer (urtekræmmer), resided in the basement with his wife Dorthe Frederike Petersen (née Winther) and two employees. Hans P. Møller, a master shoemaker, resided in the other basement apartment with his wife Marie Normann, their three children (aged 10 to 15) and two foster children (aged nine and 11) with the surname Wordtman.

No. 122 was home to a total of 27 residents at the 1860 census. A. C. v. Osten, a 44-year-old widow, resided in one of the ground-floor apartments with her two children (aged nine and 15) and one lodger. Carl Ludvig Steen, an assistant, resided in the other ground-floor apartment with his wife Elisabeth Steen and one lodger. Edward Cohen, a Royal Danish Mail clerk, resided in the building with his wife Charlotte Amalie Wandel Cohen, their two-year-old son and one maid. Marie Walentin, a 33-year-old widow, resided in the other first-floor apartment with her two-year-old daughter Selma Alende and one maid. Peter Henrichsen, a carpenter, resided in one of the second-floor apartments with his wife Christine Henrichsen and their three children (aged 13 to 22). Heinrich Schneider, a teacher, resided in the other second-floor apartment with his wife Thora Schneider and their two-year-old son Martinus Julius Schneider. Lars Petersen, the 65-year-old proprietor of the grocery shop (urtelræmmer) in the basement, resided in the associated dwelling with his wife Dorthea Frederike Petersen, two employees and one maid.

=== 20th century ===
The building was refurbished in 1960 under the supervision of the architect Svend Lindholm (born 1917). The artist Otto Frello purchased the property in 1966 and members of his family owned and lived in it until 2016. The new owner, Ejendomsselskabet V.S. Larsen A/S, a property company, carried out a comprehensive restoration of the building. In 2018 it was sold for DKK 32.5.

== Architecture ==
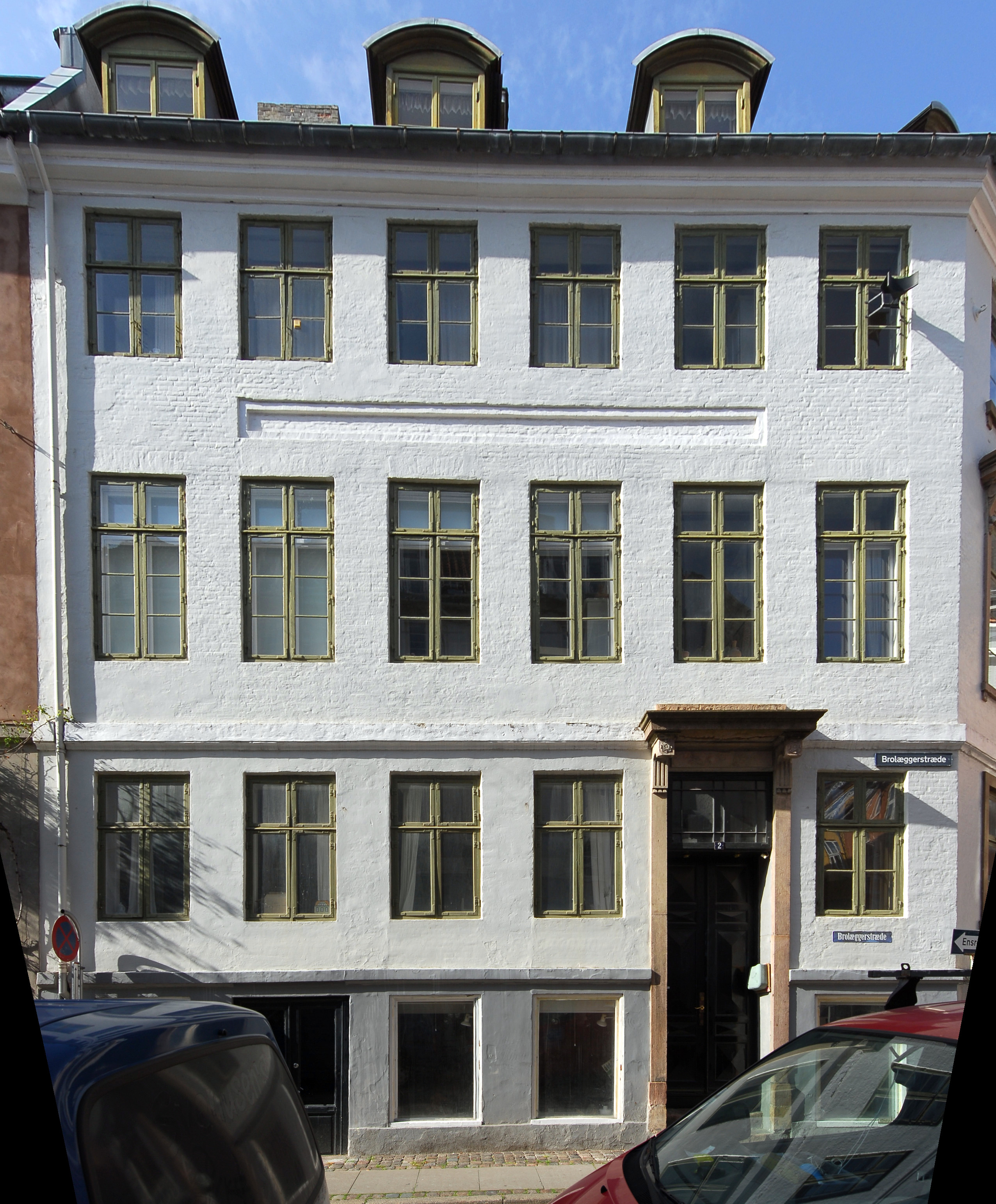
The facade towards Brolæggerstræde

Brolæggerstræde 2 is constructed with three floors over a walk-out basement. It has six bays towards Brolægggerstræde, a chamfered corner bay and five bays towards Badstuestræde.

The building has a total floor area of 622 square metres. Many original doors, panels, floors and other details in the building have been preserved.

The first floor features a trompe-l'œil mural of a door painted by Otto Frello. He also created other eclectic details, including a glazed niche in one of the bathrooms with coins and banknotes and a built-in clock.

== Cultural references ==
The art gallery in the basement, then Gallerie Toulouse, was used as a location in the 1961 film Een blandt mange.

== Gallery ==
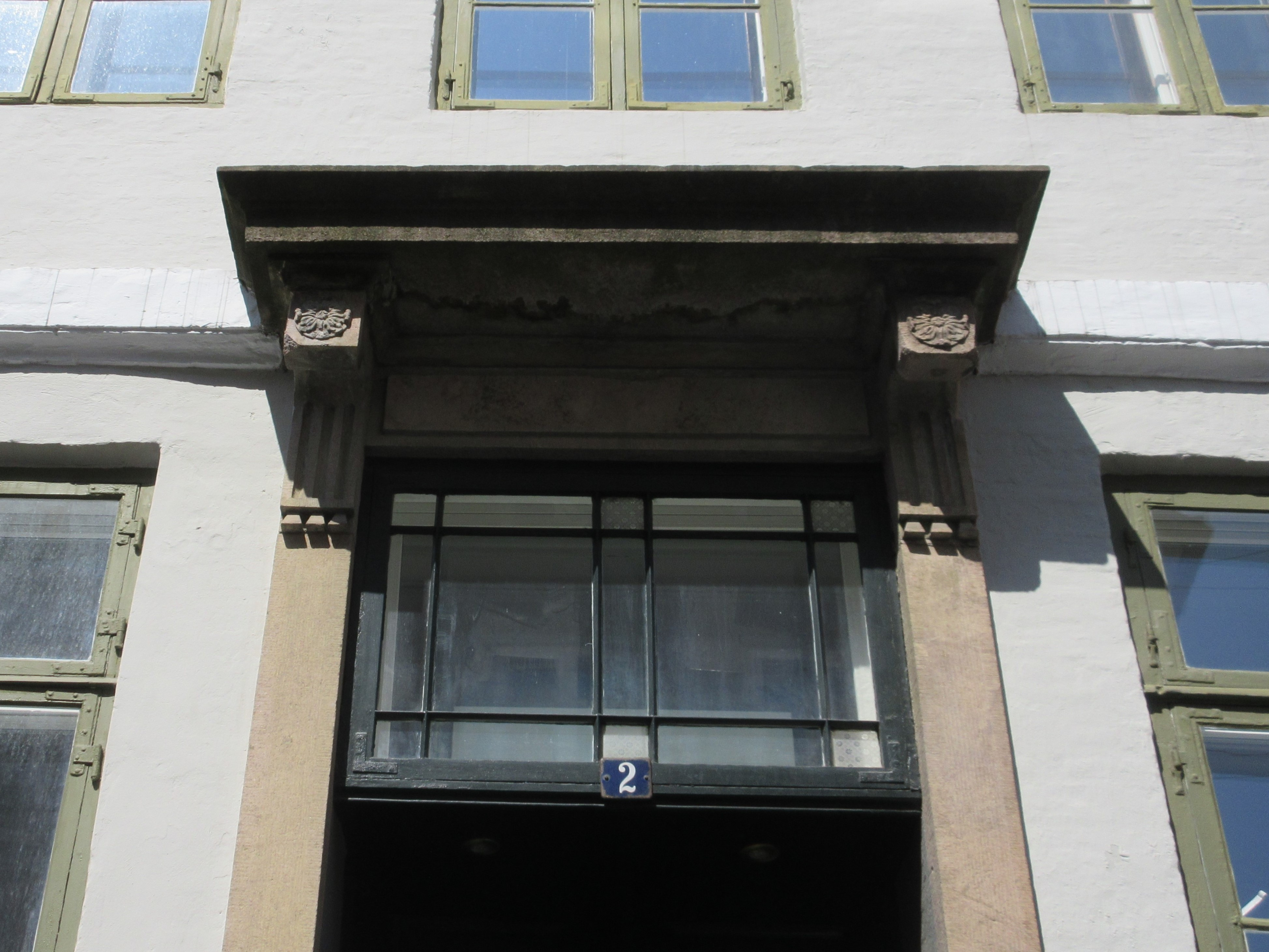
Detail of the transom window above the main entrance
