= Tellef =

Tellef is a given name. Notable people with the given name include:

- Tellef Inge Mørland (born 1980), Norwegian politician
- Tellef Øgrim (born 1958), Norwegian fretless guitarist, composer and journalist
- Tellef Dahll Schweigaard (1806–1886), Norwegian politician
- Tellef Wagle (1883–1957), Norwegian sailor
