= Concert Fantasia =

Concert Fantasia may refer to:

- Concert Fantasia (Tchaikovsky)
- Concert Fantasia (Malling)
