= Otto Malling =

Danish composer (1848-1915)

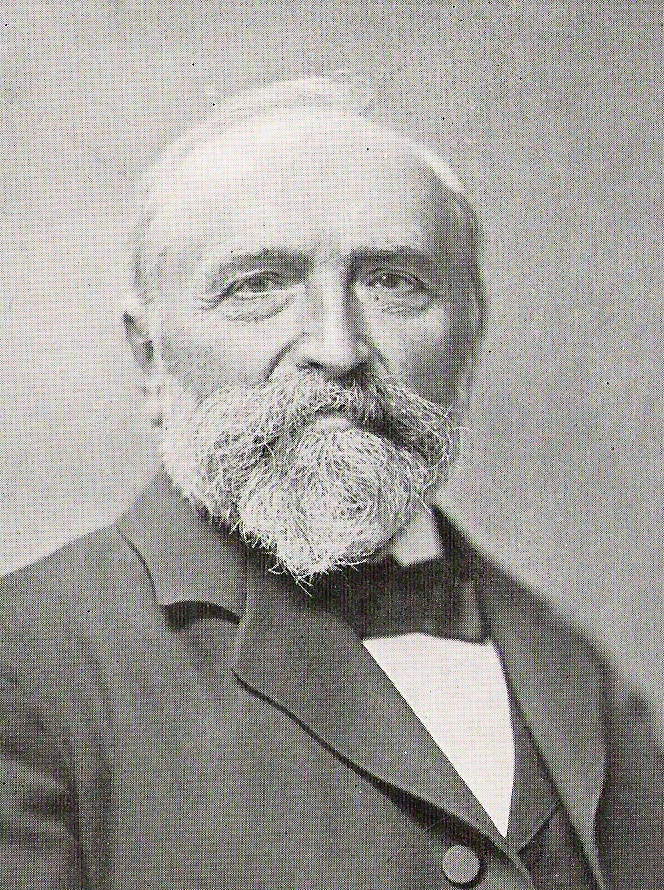
Otto Malling

Otto Valdemar Malling (1 June 1848 – 5 October 1915) was a Danish composer, from 1900 the cathedral organist in Copenhagen and from 1889 professor, then from 1899 Director of the Royal Danish Academy of Music, Copenhagen.

Otto Malling was born in Copenhagen. He became a pupil of Niels Wilhelm Gade and Johan Peter Emilius Hartmann; in his later career he mainly composed organ works and vocal music, but he also wrote a Fantasia for Violin and Orchestra, Op. 20, an appealing Schumannesque piano trio (in A minor, opus 36, 1889), piano quartet (in C minor, opus 80), and a Brahmsian piano concerto in C minor (opus 43, 1890), all of which are recorded and infrequently heard in concert. His output also contains among other substantial works a cantata Det hellige Land, opus 46, (published in 1897), a symphony in D minor, opus 17 (published in 1884), and an octet for strings, opus 50 (published in or before 1907). Malling wrote the first Danish textbook in orchestration, along French conservatory lines.

He taught musical theory to Knudåge Riisager in 1915. He was also a music editor, creating piano reductions and vocal scores of works by Johan Peter Emilius Hartmann, Niels Wilhelm Gade and Christian Julius Hansen for the publisher Samfundet til udgivelse af dansk Musik.

He was a co-founder and vice-conductor of The Concert Society, Copenhagen (1874), supporting himself as organist at various Copenhagen churches. His scores of organ music brought Malling some reputation abroad, but after his death he was soon forgotten in his native country as musical tastes changed. In the late 20th century, several of his concert works were recorded.

== Selected works ==
- Songs for men's choir, op. 1 (1879)
- Symphony in D minor, Op. 17 (1884)
- Concert Fantasy, op. 20 (violin and orchestra) (1884)
- Prologue to The Golden Legend, op. 25 (for solo, choir and orchestra) (1885)
- Piano trio, op. 36 (1889)
- Piano Concerto in C minor, Op. 43 (1890)
- The Holy Land op. 46 (for choir and orchestra) (1891)
- Birth of Christ op. 48 (organ) (1892)
- Christ's Death and Resurrection op. 54 (organ) (1895)
- The storm on Copenhagen op. 60 (song and orchestra) (1895)
- Of Christ's Life op. 63 (organ) (1897)
- Paul op. 81 (organ) (1903)
- The Seven Words on the Cross (organ) (1904)
- Cinderella op. 90 (ballet) (1908)
- String Octet, op. 50
- String Quartet
- Piano quintet
