= Rådhusstræde 17 =

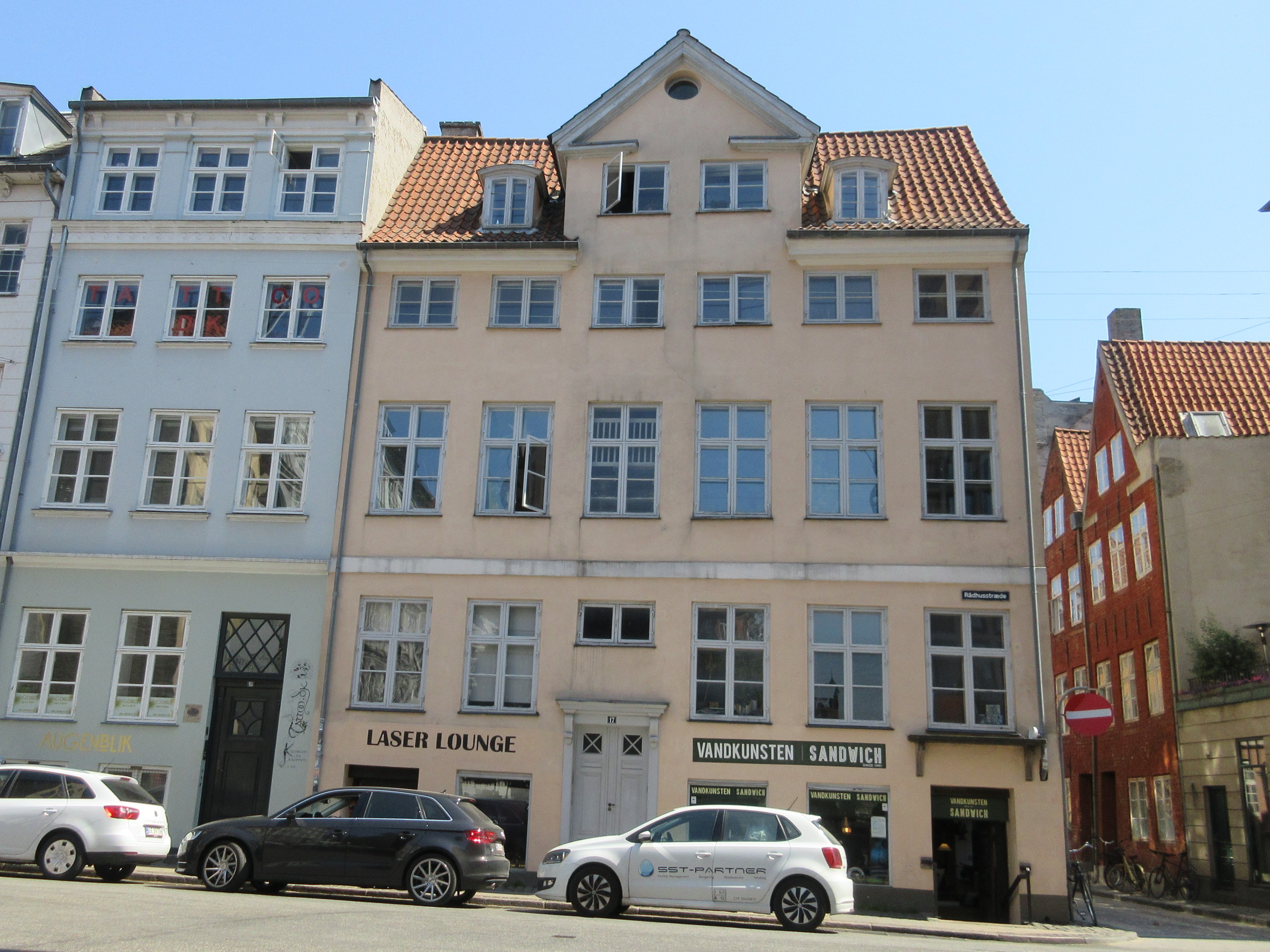
- Interactive map of the Rådhusstræde 17 area

General information
- Location: Copenhagen, Denmark
- Coordinates: 55°40′34.5″N 12°34′29.5″E
- Completed: c. 1700

Rådhusstræde 17 is a Neoclassical property situated at the corner of Rådhusstræde and Magstræde, opposite Vandkunsten, in the Old Town of Copenhagen, Denmark. Dating from approximately 1800, it is one of the oldest buildings in the area. It was listed in the Danish registry of protected buildings and places in 1945.

== History ==
=== 18th century ===
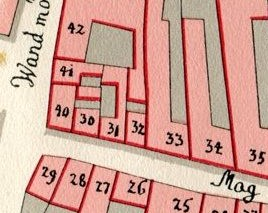
No. 40 seen on a detail from Christian Gedde's map of Snaren's Quarter, 1757.

The property was listed as No. 46 in Snaren's Quarter in Copenhagen's first cadastre of 1689 and was at that time owned by former Royal Life Guard (drabant) Nikolaj Ballii. The current building on the site was probably constructed around 1700 and later adapted around 1740. The property was listed as No. 40 in the new cadastre of 1756 and was then owned by beer vendor (øltapper) Otte Jensen.

At the time of the 1787 census, No. 40 was owned by flour merchant (melhandler) Jens Fuhr. He resided in the building with his wife Birgithe Catrine, their two children (aged nine and eleven), a daughter from his wife's first marriage (aged 20), a maid and three lodgers.

=== 19th century ===
The property was still owned by Jens Fuhr at the time of the 1801 census, now acting as rodemester, a sort of district executive for Snaren's Quarter. He lived in the building with his wife Birgitte Cathrine Huulevad, their daughter Cathrine Maria Fuhr and maid Karen Knudsdatter. Johan Hansen, a grocer (høker), resided in the building with his wife Anne Marie Lousgaard, their three sons (aged three to seven) and five lodgers.

The property was listed as No. 38 in the new cadastre of 1806. It was owned by J. Fischer's widow at the time.

The property was home to a total of 27 people at the time of the 1840 census. Lauritz Hendrik Brendstrup, a master glazier, resided on the ground floor with his wife Juliane Maria Thostrup, their two children (aged one and three) and two apprentices. Mads Larsen Møller, another grocer (høker) resided in the basement with his wife Karen Møller, their two children (aged nine and eleven) and a maid. Peter Zacharias Thostrup (1782–1953), a grocer (høker), resided in the apartment on the first floor to the right with his wife Ane Maria Thostrupand their 20-year-old daughter Hansiena Dorthea Thostrup. Maren Dorthea Jacobsen and Enger Maria Regine Jacobsen, a mother and daughter employed with needlework, resided in the first floor apartment to the left. Søren Hansen Møller, a servant, resided in the second floor apartment to the right with his wife Anne Møller, their two children (aged five and seven) and the copperplate engraver Anne Kristiene Kofod, a 57-year-old widow with a pension, resided in the second floor apartment to the left with 28-year-old needleworker Maria Sopia Frederika Kofod, 60-year-old needleworker Sinild Herlena Boutteler and eight-year-old boy Ferttenant Julius Lend. Ivert Albræct Dam, a book printer, resided on the third floor with his wife Gartruv Dam.

The property was home to a total of 21 people at the time of the 1860 census. Johannes Møllestrøm, a master shoemaker, was now residing on the ground floor with his wife Johannes Møllestrøm, their two daughters (aged two and four) and three employees. Hans Henrik Weybell, a grocer (høker), resided in the basement with his wife Anna née Hansen and stepson Carl Jean Dupon. Hendrik Mandix, a tailor, resided in one of the first floor apartments with his wife and Augusta née Schou and mother-in-law Helene Schou. Ane Cathrine Elisabeth Hagen and Julie Sophie Henriette Hagen, two women employed with needlework, resided in the other first-floor apartment. Bolette Jacobsen, widow of a master shoemaker, resided in one of the second floor apartments with her daughter Lovise Wilhelmine Jacobsen. Jørgen Nielsen, a royal courier (Kgl. Estafet), resided with his wife Ane Albrecktsdatter in the other second floor apartment. Christiane Grefstad, the widow of a cooper, resided in the third floor apartment with her unmarried daughter Laura Eline Catrine Grefstad.

At the time of the 1880 census, Rådhusstræde 17 was home to 22 residents in seven households. Hans Peter Sørensen, a barber, resided on the ground floor and first floor to the right. He lived there with his wife Jacobine Anna Cathrine (née Olsen), their three children (aged one to five), a barber working in his barber shop and one maid. Anders Jensen, a carpenter, resided on the ground floor to the left with his wife Karen Marie Jensen (née Christiansen). Anna Marie Dorthea Møllerstrøm, Julie Elisabeth Jensine Møllerstrøm and Alfred Johannes Møllerstrøm—three siblins—resided in the apartment of the first floor to the left. The two sisters worked as seamstresses for a women's tailor. Their brother was an instrument maker. Hans Jensen, a coachman, resided on the second floor to the right with his Hanne Sophie Jensen (née Larsen) and a 10-year-old foster daughter. Frederik Christian Frederiksen, a building painter, resided in the apartment on the second floor to the left with his Laura Nathalie Josephi (née Refling= and their six-year-old daughter). Niels Andreas Petersen, a workman, resided on the third floor with his wife Christine Else (née Christensen). Niels Andersen, a grocer (høker), resided in the basement with his wife Johanne Andersen (née Nielsen).

=== 19th century ===
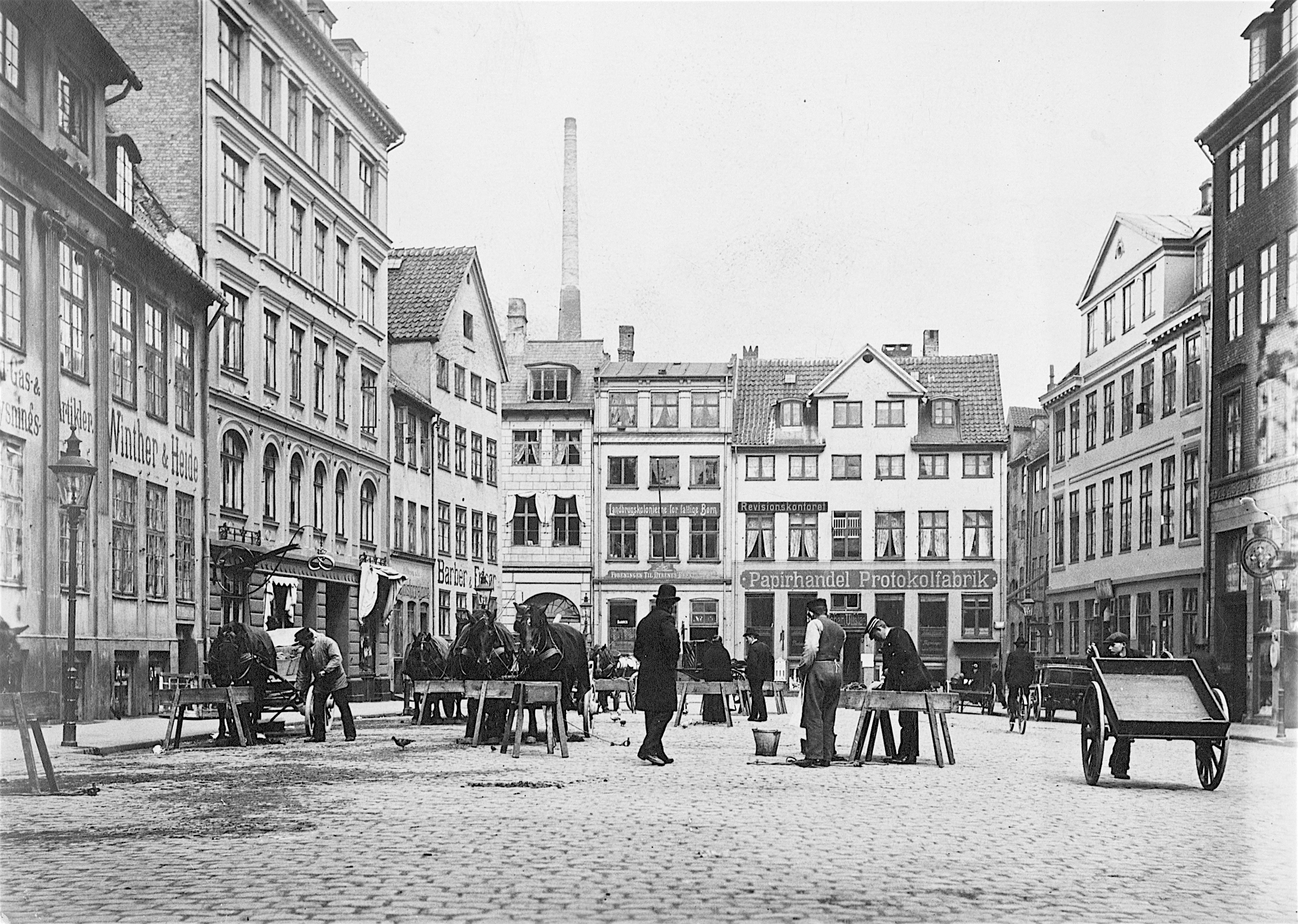
Rådhusstræde 17 seen from Vandkunsten on a photography by Fritz Theodor Benzen, 1903.

Johan Ullstad (1865–1931) opened a stationery business and factory for books used for records and accounting in the building in 1898. From 1908 onwards, starting with paper storage, Johan Ullstad & Sønner relocated to the building at Kompagnistræde 10.

The interior of the building was renovated in the 1960s.

== Architecture ==
Rådhusstræde 17 is a three-storey corner building constructed in brick towards Rådhusstræde and with timber framing on the two gables and towards the yard. The plastered facade is finished with a white-painted belt course above the ground floor and a white cornice. The principal facade on Rådhusstræde is crowned by a two-bay gabled wall dormer with cornice returns, flanked by two smaller dormer windows in the pitched tile roof. The main entrance is topped by a hood mould supported by corbels. Most of the windows on the upper floors of the gable that faces Magstræde have been blinded. A perpendicular wing extends from the rear side of the building.

== Today ==
The property is owned by E/F Rådhusstræde 17.

== Gallery ==
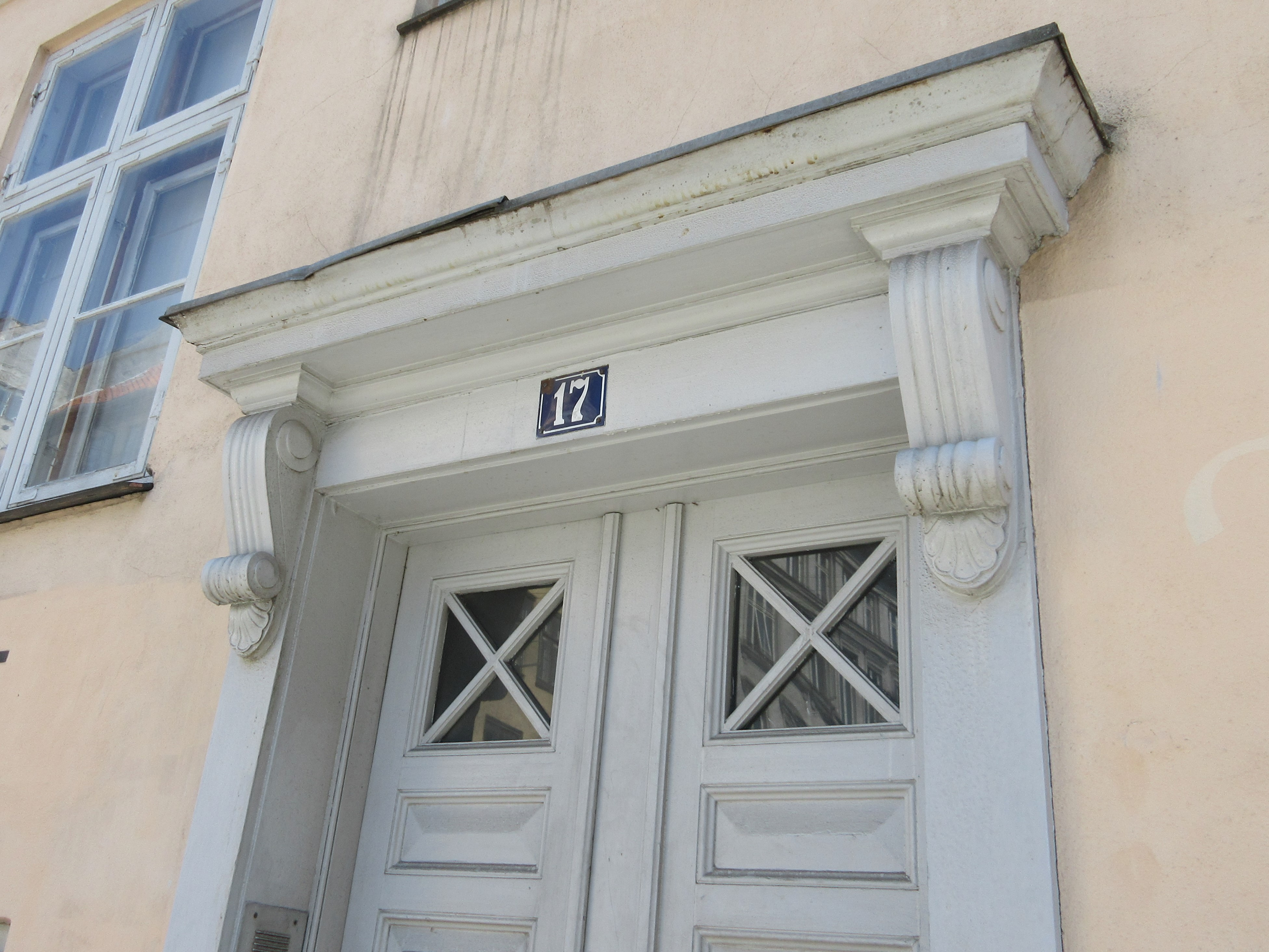
Hood mould above the main entrance.

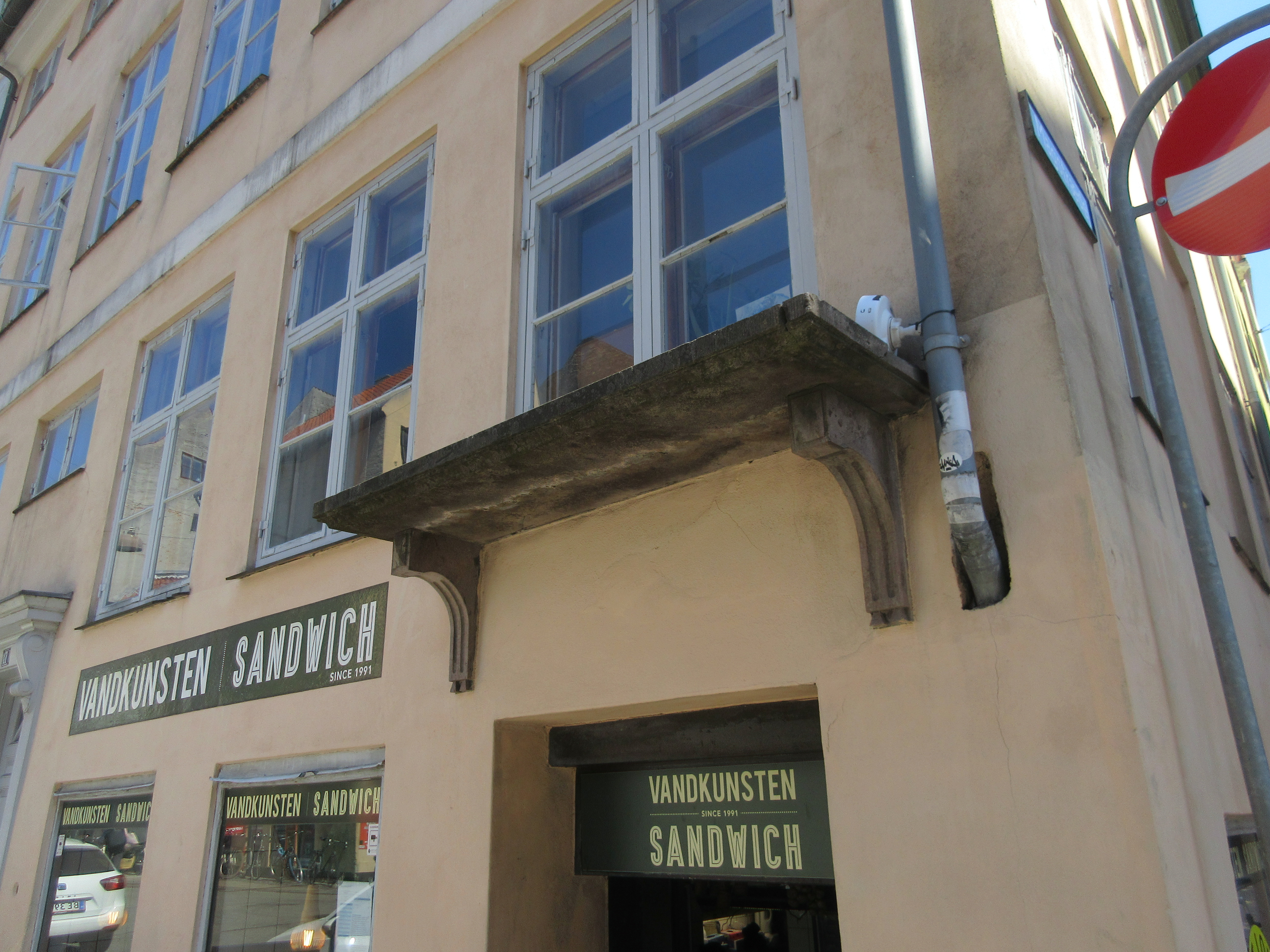
Hood mould above the basement entrance.
