= Øgrim =

Øgrim is a Norwegian surname. Notable people with the surname include:

- Otto Øgrim (1913–2006), Norwegian physicist
- Tellef Øgrim (born 1958), Norwegian fretless guitarist, composer, and journalist
- Tron Øgrim (1947–2007), Norwegian journalist, author, and politician
