= Brolæggerstræde =

Street in Copenhagen, Denmark

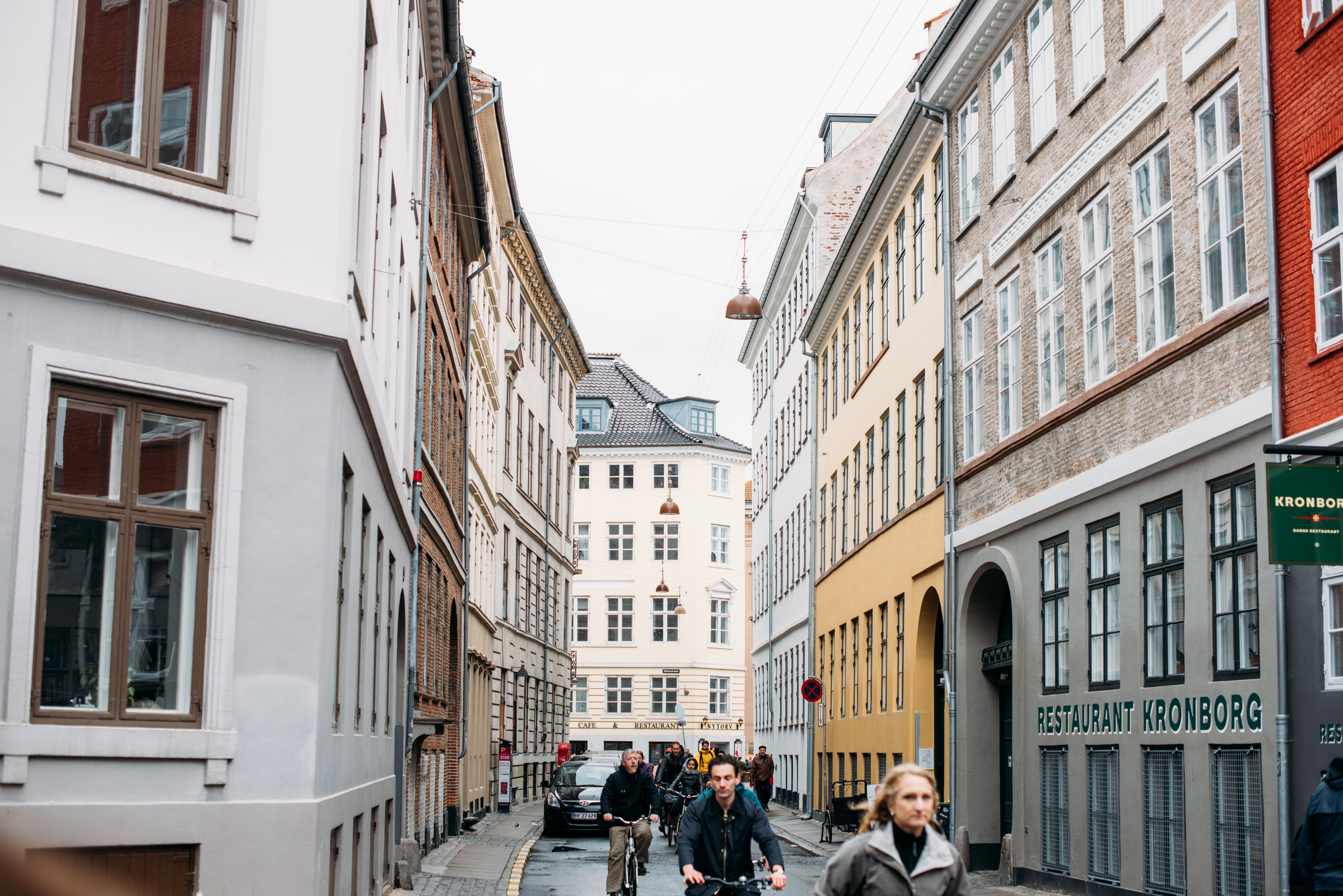
- Brolæggerstræde
- Length: 128 m (420 ft)
- Location: Indre By, Copenhagen, Denmark
- Postal code: 1211
- Coordinates: 55°40′39.36″N 12°34′28.92″E

Brolæggerstræde (literally "Cobble-Layer Alley) is a street in the Old Town of Copenhagen, Denmark, linking Nytorv in the west with Badstuestræde in the east. Most of the buildings in the street date from the years after the Copenhagen Fire of 1795. The Carlsberg Foundation is headquartered at No. 5.

== History ==
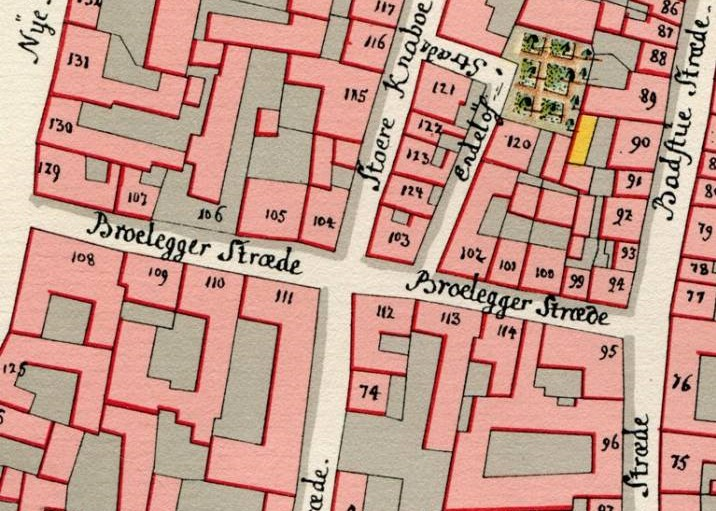
Brolæggerstræde as seen on Gedde's district map of Copenhagen

The street was originally called Benickestræde. In 1543, it is referred to as Per Broliggers Stræde. The name refers to Per Jensen "Brolægger" who from 1486 to 1510 owned the lot where No. 14 stands today. He was the first master cobble layer in Copenhagen. His son, Jens Brolægger, was mayor of Copenhagen from 1520. The Taylors' Guild was for a while based where No. 4 and 6 stand today. Their building was also used as a venue for German comedies. From the 1650s, the street was also home to breweries.

Knabrostræde connected the south side of the street to the coast at Gammel Strand. Endeløsstræde ("Endless Alley"), a short cul-de-sac, extended northwards a little further to the east. When the street was rebuilt following the Copenhagen Fire of 1728, Knabrostræde was extended northwards to Vimmelskaftet and Endeløsstræde was later connected to its east side. In 1795, the street was destroyed by the second great fire that hit Copenhagen. Endeløsstræde disappeared when the houses were rebuilt.

== Notable buildings and residents ==
All the buildings in the street date from the years immediately after the fire of 1795 and all of them are listed on the Danish registry of Protected buildings and Places.

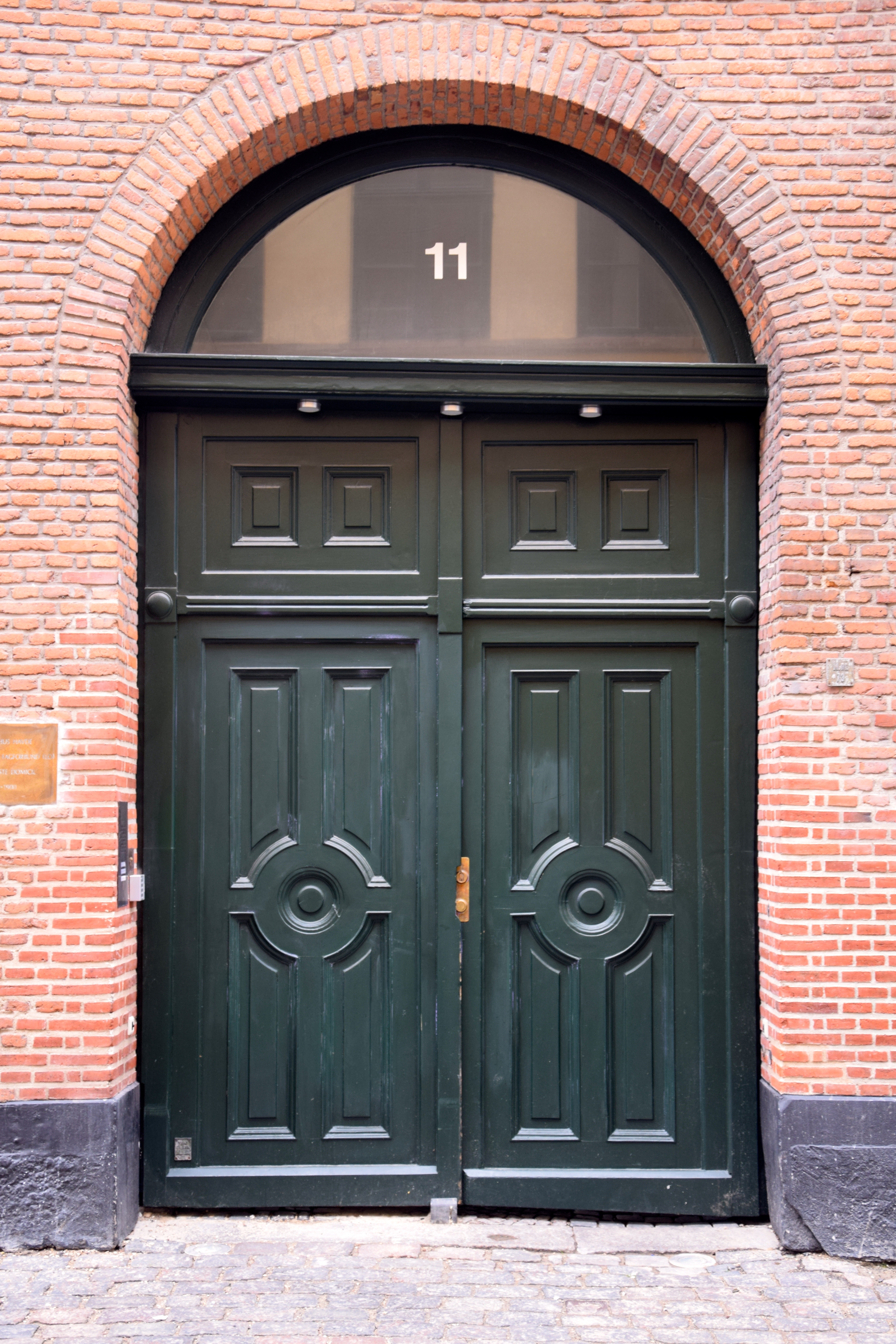
The gate at Brolæggerstræde 11

Carlsberg-founder J.C. Jacobsen's first brewery, known as Bryggergården, is located at No. 5. The complex also comprises Knabrostræde 11 and 13 as well as several interconnected rear wings. It was built 1796-99 for another brewer, Nicolai Rindom. J. C. Jacobsen's father, Christian Jacobsen, purchased the brewery in 1826. A plaque above the gate commemorates J. C. Jacobsen and his son Carl Jacobsen. The inscription reads: "Brygger, dr.phil. Carl Chr. H. Jacobsen fødtes her den 2den marts 1842. Brygger, kaptajn J. C. Jacobsen foretog her året 1838 de første forsøg med fremstilling af undergæret øl". The building was refurbished by the architect Viggo Steen Møller in the early 1950s and now houses the Ny Carlsberg Foundation.

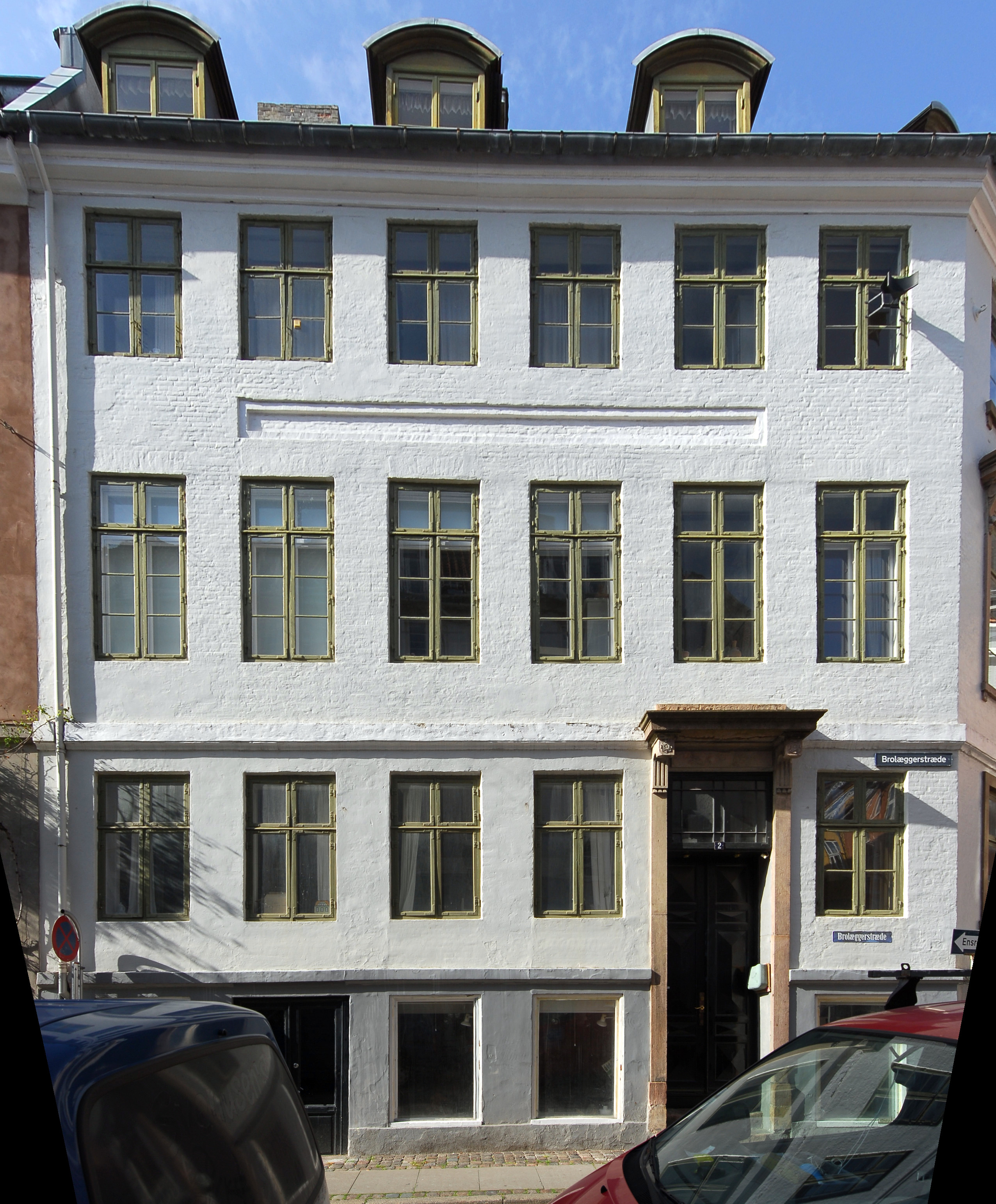
Brolæggerstræde 2

The brick building at No. 11 on the opposite side of the street was built for another brewer, Andreas Tronier. A brass plaque to the left of the gate commemorates the Danish Confederation of Trade Unions which had its first home in the building from 1898 until 1950. Gyldenfeldts Gård (Brolæggerstræde 9/Knabrostræde 16) was built for Adjutant General Gyldenfeldt in 1795–98.

The other buildings in the street are No.1 (1797, C. F. Hollander), No. 2 (1808), No. 3 (1797, Lauritz Thrane), No. 4 (1808, A. C. Wilcken), No. 6 (1798), No. 8 (1797, C. C. Martens ), No. 12 (1796), Brolæggerstræde 13/Rådhusstræde 1 (1798, Andreas Hallander), No. 14 (1798) and Brolæggerstræde 16/Nytorv 11 (1798, C. F. Hollander).

== Cultural references ==
In Ludvig Holberg's comedy Uden Hoved og Hale, when the god Vulcanus visits Earth to attend a comedy, he is recommended the German comedies in Brolæggerstræde: "Yes, if it so, my dear Monsieur Vulcanus, then it is best that you go to the German comedies in the Brolægger-Stræde; for there you can see sieges, field battles, witchcraft and the history of half a century at once." ("Ja, hvis saa er, min kiære Monsieur Vulcanus, saa er det bedst, at I gaar paa de Tydske Comedier i Brolægger-Strædet; thi der kand I faa at se Beleiringer, Feldslag, Gespenster, Hexerie og et halvt Hundrede Aars Historie paa eengang ...").
