= Kompagnistræde 10 =

Building in Copenhagen, Denmark

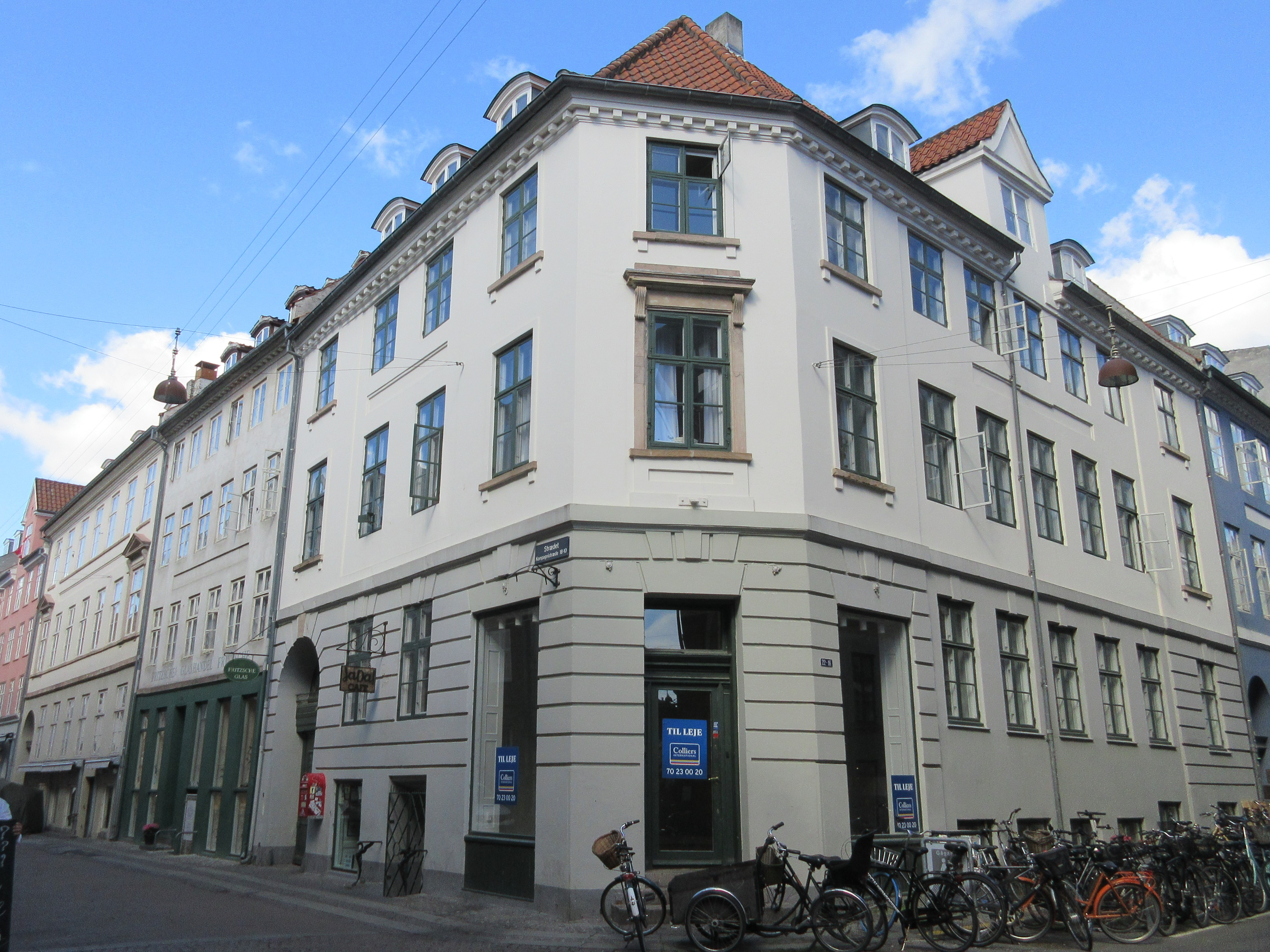
- Interactive map of the Kompagnistræde 10 area

General information
- Location: Copenhagen, Denmark
- Coordinates: 55°40′39″N 12°34′33.74″E
- Completed: 1796

Kompagnistræde 10 is a Neoclassical property situated at the corner of Kompagnistræde and Badstuestræde in the Old Town of Copenhagen, Denmark. A bakery was operated on the site from at least the 17th century until the late 19th century. Like many of the other buildings in the area, the current building was constructed as part of the rebuilding of the city following the Copenhagen Fire of 1795. A gilded relief of a kringle above a door in the courtyard bears testament to the former use of the property. The entire complex was listed in the Danish registry of protected buildings and places in 1949. Former residents include orientalist Carl Theodor Johannsen and composer Christian Julius Hansen.

== History ==
=== 18th century ===
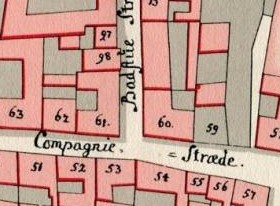
No. 61 seen on a detail from Christian Gedde's map of Snaren's Quarter, 1757.

The property was listed in Copenhagen's first cadastre of 1689 as No. 63 in Snaren's Quarter and was at that time owned by baker Richert Joris. It was listed as No. 61 in the new cadastre of 1756 and was at that time owned by baker Christian Drevitz.

The property was owned by master baker Peder Lou by 1787. He lived there with his wife Maren Christens Datter, his mother-in-law Malene Christensen, three bakers and one maid. At the time of the 1787 census, the property was also home to two more households. One of them consisted of customs toller (vejermester) Andreas Tommesen, his wife Mette Tomsen and maid Mette Hans Datter. The third household consisted of beer vendor (øltapper) Rasmus Hendrichsen, his wife Mette Mons datter and their lodger, Andreas Jensen, employed as a smith at Orlogsværftet at Holmen.

Together with most of the other buildings in the area, the building was destroyed in the Copenhagen Fire of 1795. The current building on the site was constructed in 1795–1796 for master baker Peder Lou. The bread production took place in the basement and the retail space, operating under the name Brødstuen ("The Bread Room"), was located on the ground floor. A residence for the proprietor and his staff occupied the rest of the ground floor.

=== 19th century ===
At the time of the 1801 census, Peder Lou was residing in the ground floor apartment with his wife Maren Beg, their 11-year-old son Christen Lau, six employees in the bakery and two maids. Hans Christ. Knudsen (1724–1803), former archivist of the Danish Chancery, resided on one of the upper floors with three of his grandchildren and lodger Juliane Margrethe Just. The third household consisted of innkeeper Mats Andersen, his wife Kirstine Voigt and their three children.

The property was listed as No. 65 in the new cadastre of 1806. It was still owned by Peder Lou.

The property was home to 21 residents at the 1840 census. Henrich Jörss, a master baker, resided on the ground floor with his wife Angedenta and their five children. Three bakers, four apprentices and two maids were also living there with them. Carl Theodor Johannsen (1804–1840), an extraordinary professor of Oriental philology and literature at the University of Copenhagen, resided on the first floor with his wife Minna née Wolffagen, their one-year-old son Ernst and maid Jacobine Philipsen. Theology students and brothers Christian Malta Müller (1818–1896) and Anton Adolph Georg Müller (1820–1992) resided on the second floor. Their father Jeremias Müller was pastor of Vejby-Tibirkeom North Zealand.

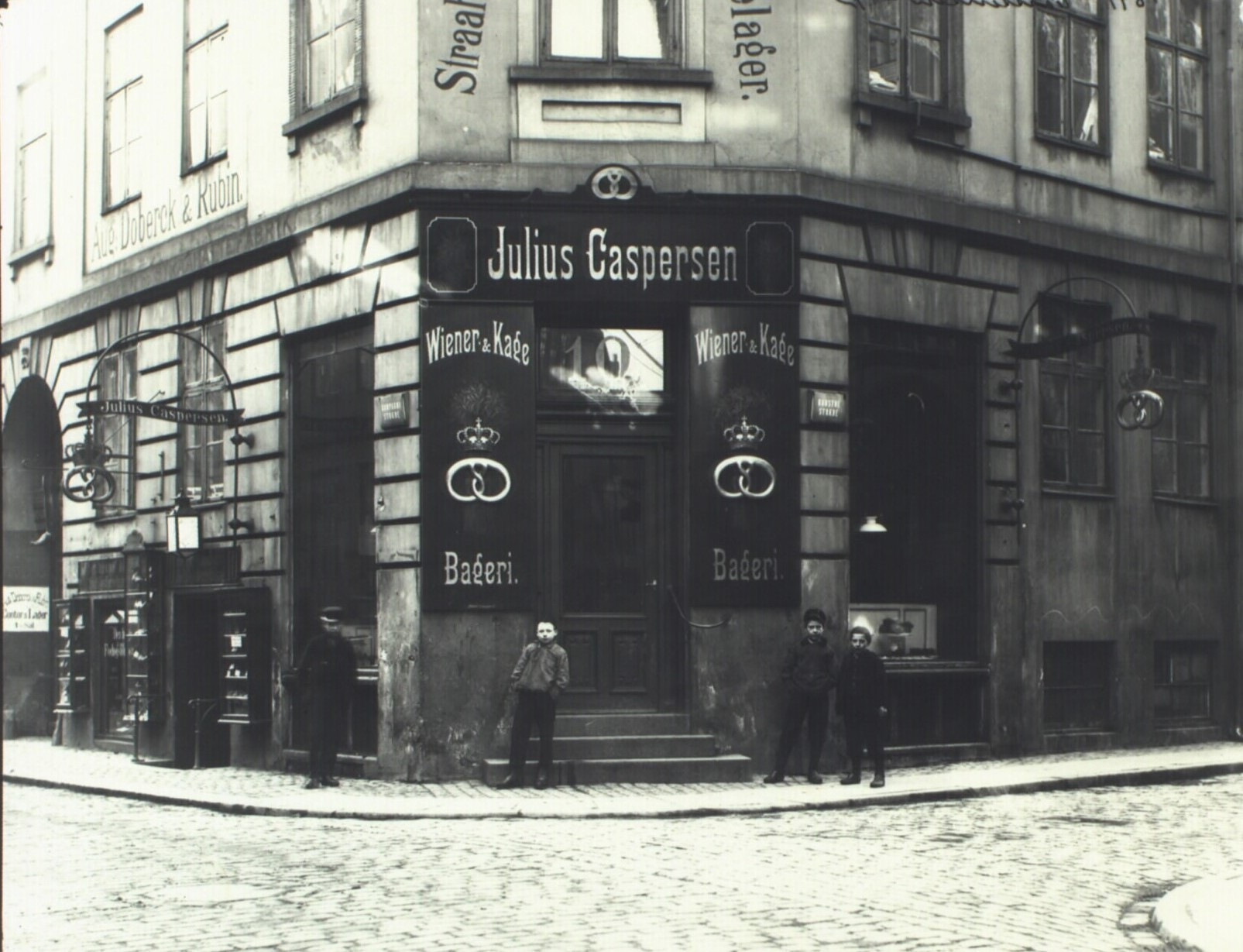
Julius Caspersen's bakery at No. 10

Composer Christian Julius Hansen (1814–1875) was among the residents in 1841.

The property was home to 17 residents in four households at the 1850 census.

Christian Stolpe, a new master baker, just 37 years old but already a widower, resided on the ground floor with three bakers, one apprentice and one maid. Caren Olsen, a 50-year-old unmarried woman with means, resided on the ground floor with one maid. Christian Frederich Bertelsen, a merchant, resided on the first floor with his wife Marie Lovise Bertelsen, their three children (aged four to 16), one lodger and one maid. Anna Hedvig Thomsen and Ulrikke Eleonora Thomsen, two unmarried sisters (aged 64 and 66), who supplemented their pensions with a bit of teaching, resided on the second floor.

The property was home to 14 residents at the 1860 census. Christian Stolpe, who had now remarried, resided on the ground floor with his wife Christian Stolpe, their two daughters (aged seven and seventeen), three bakers, a shop maid, a caretaker and a maid. Anna Catharina Plum, widow of textile manufacturer Johannes Seydel (c. 1778–1837). resided on the second floor with her two unmarried daughters (aged 30 and 40) and one lodger. The lodger was bailiff in Copenhagen Johan Mainert Samme.

The bakery was later taken over by Julius Caspersen. From 1893, the second floor was used by the tenant for manufacturing hats made of felt and straw.

=== 20th century ===
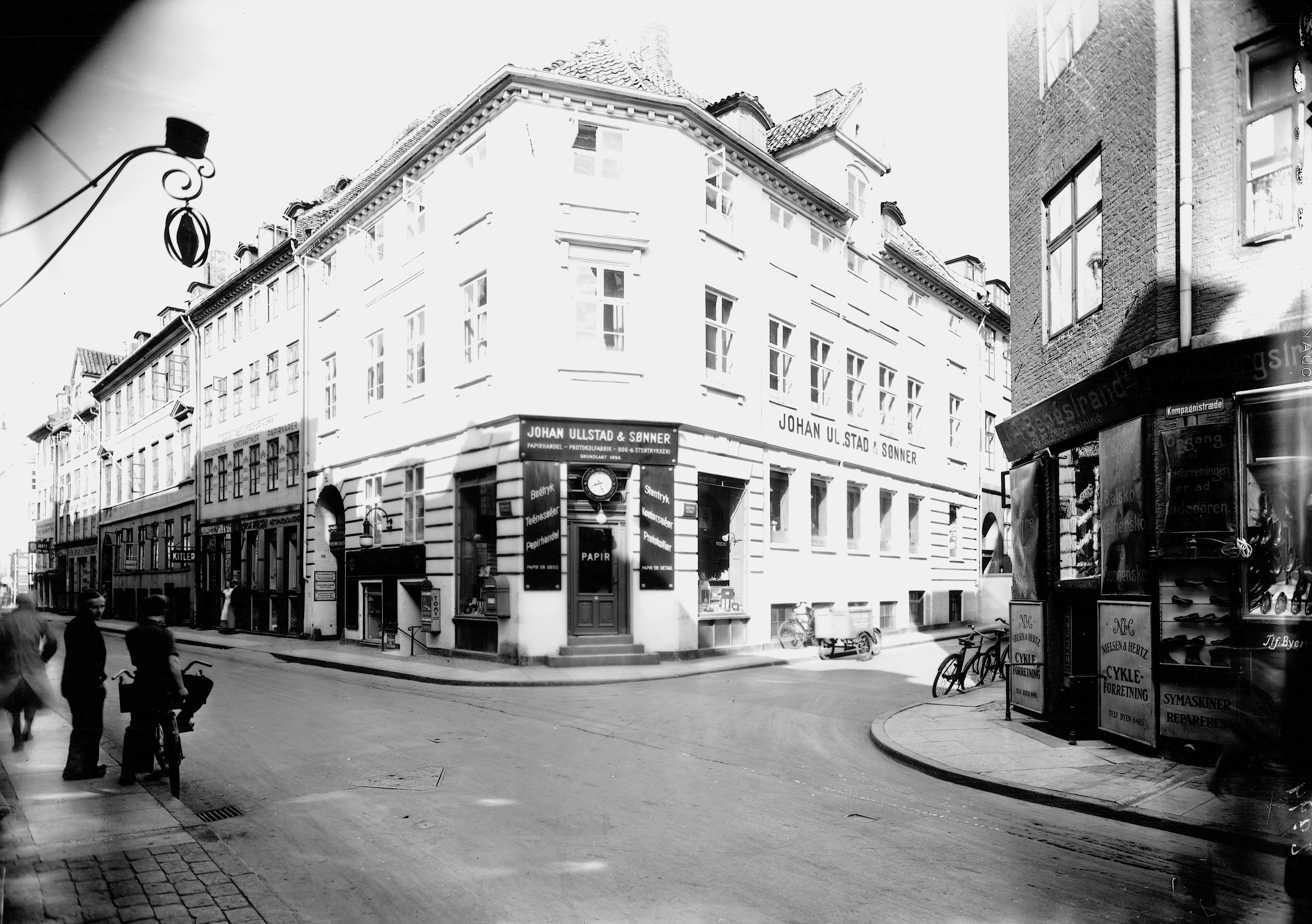
Johan Ullstad/Sønner, 1935.

On 2 April 1898, Johan Ullstad (1865–1931) opened a stationery business in the building. Johan Ullstad & Sønner would later take over a still larger part of the property. The company was continued after the founder's death by his sons Johan Ullstad (born 1892), Kai Ullstad (born 1893) and Poul Ullstad (born 1905). The firm was based in the building until at least the 1950s.

The building was acquired by lawyer and property investor Niels Arthur Andersen (born 1938) in the early 1990s.

== Architecture ==
Kompagnistræde 10 is a three-winged complex with a four-bay facade on Kompagnistræde, a seven-bay facade on Badstuestræde, both with slightly projecting outer bays, and a perpendicular wing extending from the rear side of the Bagstuestræde wing along the northwest side of a small central courtyard. A wooden fence separates the courtyard from that of Kompagnistræde 12. The chamfered corner bay was dictated for all corner buildings by Jørgen Henrich Rawert's and Peter Meyn's guidelines for the rebuilding of the city after the fire so that the fire department's long ladder companies could navigate the streets more easily. The entire complex is constructed with three storeys over a walk-out basement. The ground floor of the plastered facade is finished with shadow joints and painted in a pale grey colour, except for the five central bays towards Badstuestræde which have no shadow joints. A green-painted gate in Kompagnistræde provides access to the small courtyard as well as to the main staircase of the building via a door in one of the interior walls of the gateway. A sandstone keystone above the gate features the architectural date "1795" and the name "P. Lou", whereas a relief of a kringle has been carved away. The entrance to the shop in the ground floor is located in the corner bay. The upper part of the facade is white-painted and finished by a dentillated cornice. The windows of the slightly projecting outer bays and of the corner bay are accented with sandstone sills supported by corbels. The corner window of the beletage is in addition to this accented with a hood mould supported by corbels above it and a rectangular blinding below the window sill. The facade on Badstuestræde is crowned by a gabled wall dormer. The pitched roof is clad with red tile and features an additional five smaller dormer windows towards the street as well as two wall dormers towards the yard. The roof ridge of the Badstuestræde wing is pierced by a chimney. The perpendicular wing shares a pitched red tile roof with that of the neighboring building in Badstuestræde. The facade facing the yard are all rendered in a pale yellow colour. A door in the Badstuestræde wing is topped by a gilded relief of a kringle.

== Today ==
The building contains a shop in the basement and on the ground floor and office space on the upper floors. Ankiro, a software firm, is based in the building.

== Gallery ==
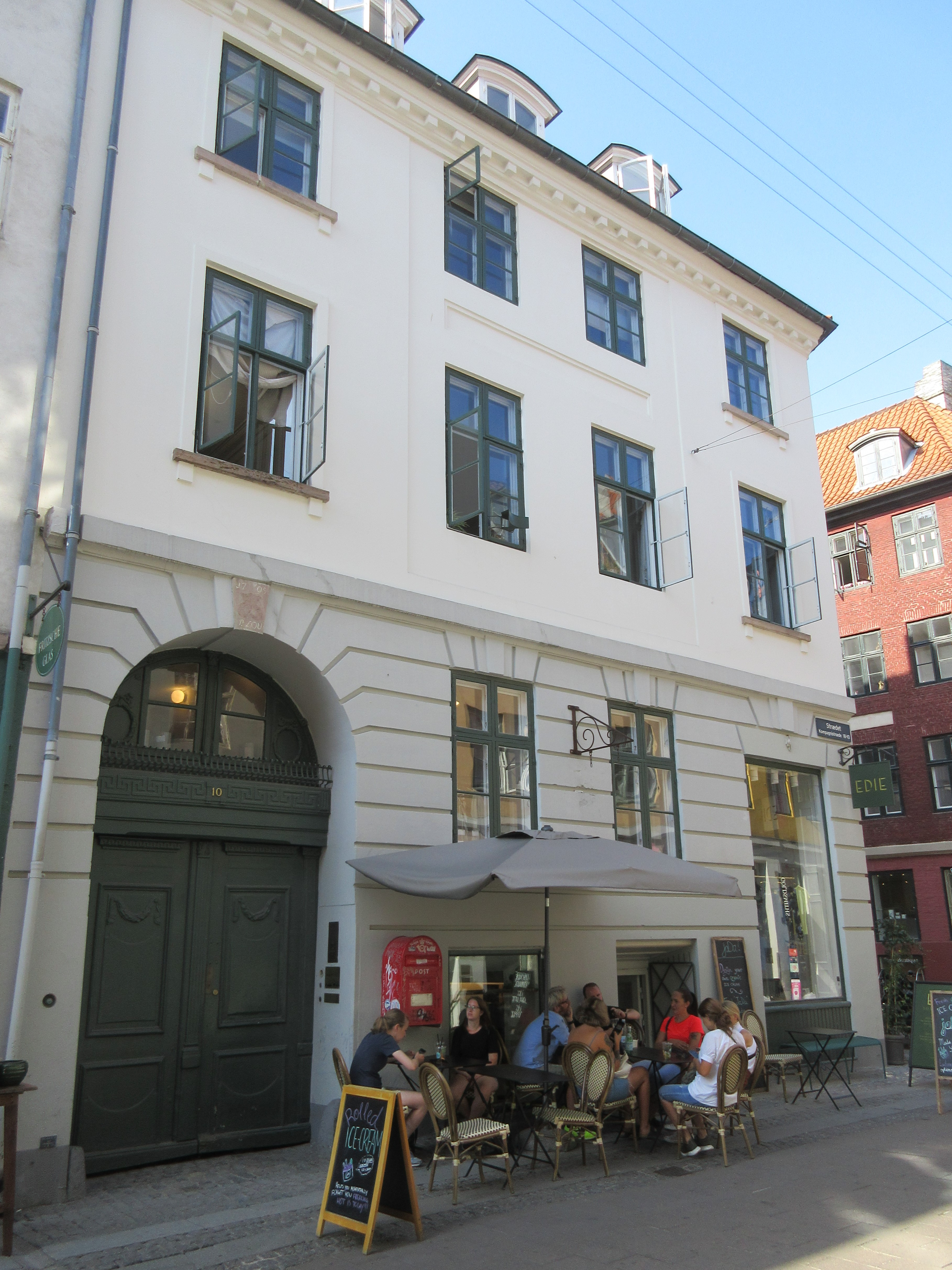
The facade on Kompagnistræde.

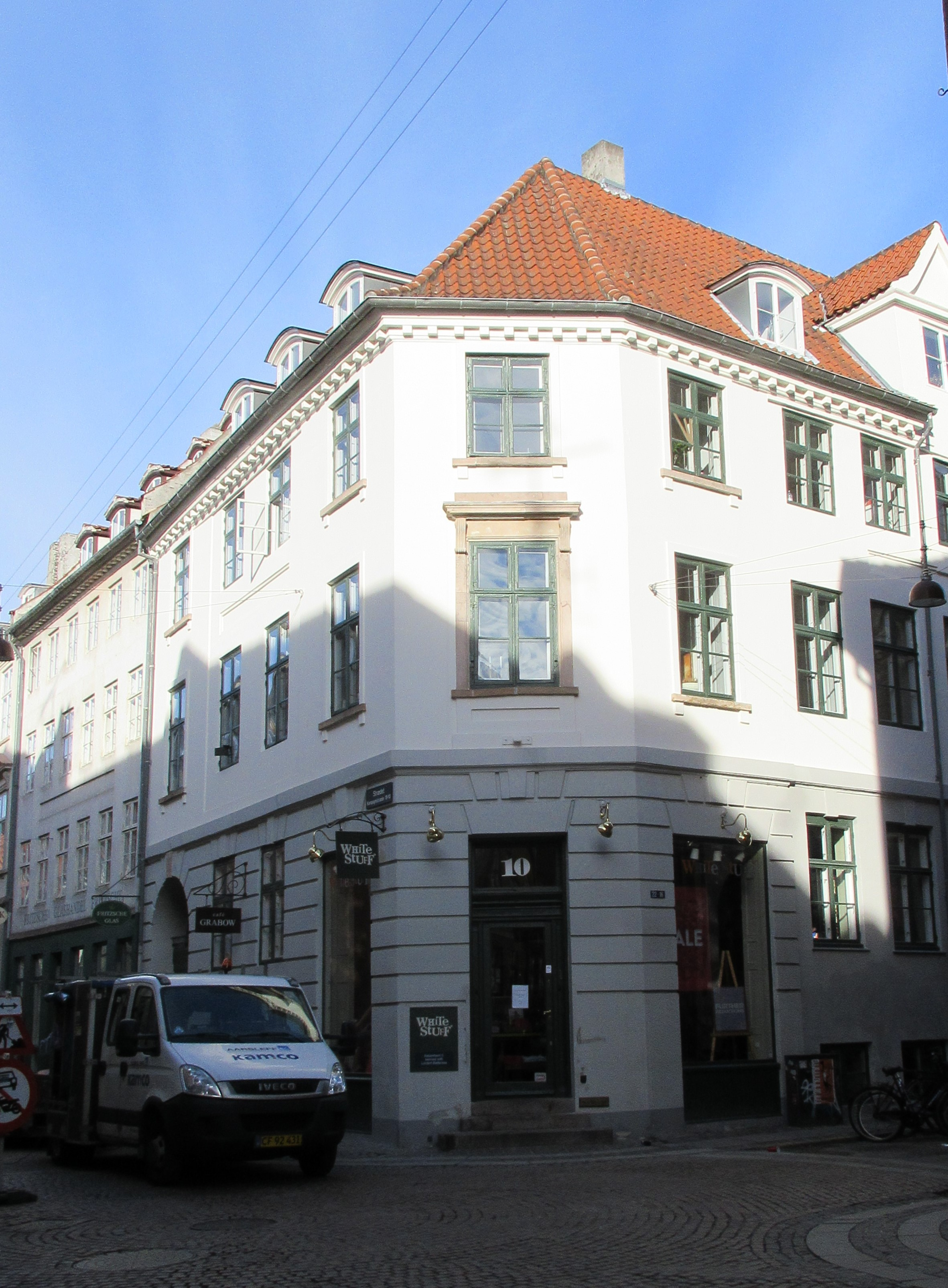
The corner
