= Een blandt mange =

1961 film

En blandt mange is a Danish 1961 drama film written and directed by Astrid Henning-Jensen.

== Plot ==
Bo is a 17 year old boy who lives with his mother in Aalborg after the divorce of his parents while his architect father lives in Copenhagen. On a visit to Copenhagen he meets a young girl at his father's workplace and immediately falls in love with her. It later turns out that it is his father's new girl friend.

== Cast ==
- Ole Wegener as Bo
- Erno Müller as Bo's father
- Elsa Kourani as Bo's mother
- Marina Lund as Hanne
- Jørgen Sindballe as The painter
- Paul Hagen as The painter's friend
- Lili Lani as The girl in the street
- Søren Weiss as The police officer
- Poul Müller as Læreren
- Ole Wisborg as advertisement photographer
- Kirsten Arnvig as Lis

== Production ==
The film was produced by ASA Film. Several scenes were shot on location in Copenhagen. Locations used in the film include Flamingo Bar, Galerie Toulouse, Ole Haslunds Hus (Amagertorv 14, Palace Hotel and Skindbuksen.
