= Otto Frello =

Otto Frello (6 April 1924 in Ovtrup, near Varde – 24 March 2015) was a Danish painter, graphic artist, cartoonist and illustrator.

Otto Frello received the 2004 Eurocon Award as the Best Artist. A square in Varde, near the former St.Jacobi school and church St.Jacobi, is named after him.

== Personal life ==
Frello purchased the property at Brolæggerstræde 2 in Copenhagen in 1966 and lived there with his family until his death.
