= Concert Fantasia (Malling) =

Composition by Otto Malling

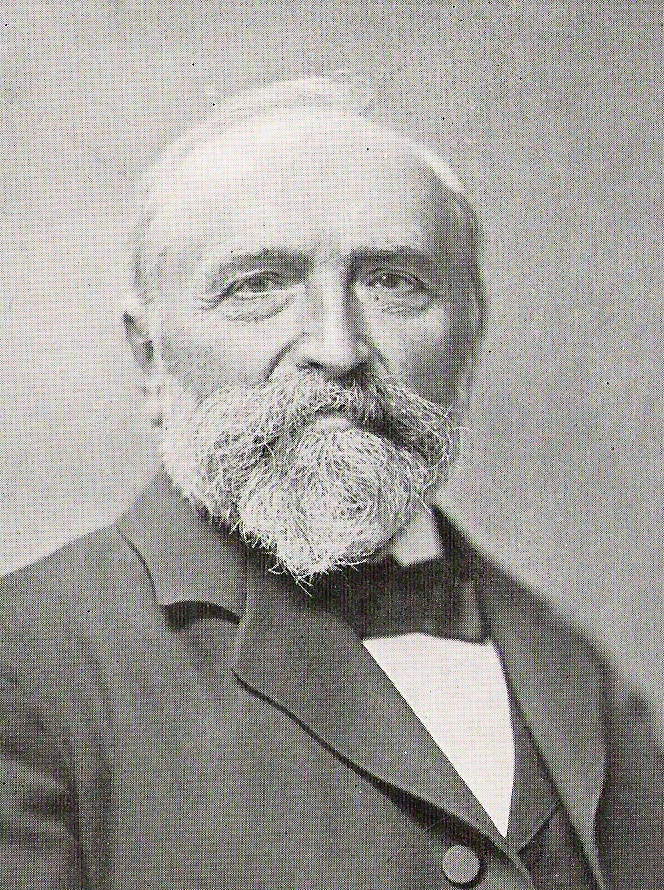
Otto Malling

Concert Fantasia (Introduction, Allegretto, Finale) for violin with orchestra, Op. 20 is the only violin concertante work by Danish composer Otto Malling published in 1885. A performance takes about 13.5–16 minutes.

== History ==
Performed for the first time in 1884 in Copenhagen by violinist Anton Svendsen with the composer himself conducting, the Fantasia was published the next year with dedication to Svendsen. It is a production of Malling's orchestral period (1880s–1893), being completed soon after his Symphony and preceding his Piano Concerto by some five years.

Though not a concert proper, it consists of three movements, which follow each other without a pause. It combines the free fantasia structure with French principles of cyclic composition. The music has a definite Nordic sound.

== Structure ==
The internal structure of the Fantasia is clarified already on the title page, where its main three sections are listed. In some way it resembles structure of a typical concerto or symphony with 3 or 4 movements: there is a scherzo, a more peaceful section, and a finale, but the piece lacks a proper opening movement, that being substituted with an introduction. Thus, the scherzo section serves also as the first substantial movement after the introduction. And the calmer middle section incorporated in it is restated at the end of the Fantasia, where it sounds triumphally. The material from the introduction is also repeated in the final movement, before the recapitulation. All of this serves to tie the different sections of the composition into a one musical whole.

The piece opens with a somber introduction (Moderato, G minor): after the orchestral statement of the theme violin first repeats it and then adds a variation. The theme is repeated again in its original form.

A brief Allegretto transitory section leads to the Allegretto scherzando (B♭ major) with an important slower section in the middle of it (F major).

A new transition (Presto – Allegro) bridges the second section with the Finale. Its theme is marked Molto allegro con brio. Starting in D minor, it soon progresses to F major. Its structure makes use of some features of the sonata form, in that one can discern exposition, development and recapitulation sections. Unexpectedly, the theme of the introduction is restated (Moderato) just before the transition (Vivo) to the recapitulation (Molto allegro, con brio). The piece ends with the triumph of the slower theme from the second section (Maestoso, ma non lento, F major).

== Recordings ==
- (1975.II.20) Kai Laursen, Aarhus Symphony Orchestra, Aksel Wellejus — (2009) DANACORD DACOCD 467-468
- (2019.X.14-16) Christina Åstrand, Turku Philharmonic Orchestra, Jukka Iisakkila — (2020) dacapo 6.220652
