= Christian Julius Hansen =

Danish composer, organist, voice teacher and choirmaster

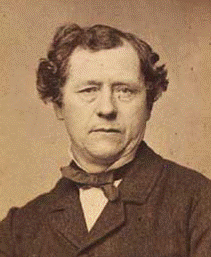
Composer, conductor and organist Christian Julius Hansen.

Christian Julius Hansen (6 May 1814 – 15 March 1875) was a Danish composer, organist, voice teacher and choirmaster. He studied with Johan Peter Emilius Hartmann; his works include songs, choral and orchestral pieces as well as light operas. In several of his song compositions Hansen revealed an uncommon sense of choral movement and considerable melodic vein, sometimes used fresh and cheerfully, sometimes on a quiet, slightly melancholic way.

== Life ==
Christian Hansen was born in Christianshavn, the son of stonemason Nicholas Hansen (1775–1834) and his second wife Frederikke Christine, née Hess (1775–1850). He was admitted to the Giuseppe Siboni Conservatory when he was 11 years old, but soon had to focus his attention on composition because his beautiful voice began to change. He was encouraged by both J.P.E. Hartmann and Christoph Ernst Friedrich Weyse, to whom he dedicated his first printed work Six Romances written in 1835. In 1840 he took part in the Musikforeningen's overture competition in Copenhagen, where Gade won first prize with his Echoes of Ossian. Hansen's Overture in E major received "honorable mention". It was performed by the Music Society on 6 April 1842 and posthumously published by the Society.

On 30 December 1836 in Gjentofte he married Marie Emilie Augusta Bugge (d. 1882) and therefore had to work for his living as music teacher, until 1845 when he was appointed organist at the Garrison Church in Copenhagen, position which he exchanged in 1851. Official duties and his gregarious nature hindered him to proceed to larger compositional forms, particularly the opera which he was very fond of. Early on, he had been associated with various choral societies as conductor (Livjægersang Association, Odeon, later Commercial and Clerical Choral Society and others), when Hartmann in 1848 got him appointed med-dirigent at the Student Choral Society for which he had great significance, being a regular conductor from 1853 until his death. In 1852 he was appointed royal chamber musician and given the affectionate nickname of Kammermusikken by his student singers. King Frederick VII of Denmark appreciated the work of Christian Hansen, who was often at court. He died in Copenhagen.

== Compositions ==
A substantial part of Hansen's compositions were written in connection with the academic life. He composed and arranged music for Jens Christian Hostrup's comedies; for the students carnival formulas he composed the funny parodie-operetta Leonora di Massa Carrara in 1855, King Rosmer in 1857, La massacrata and A sunday in the Alps or The watermill in the Apennines in 1874, in which his musical sense of humor showed great creativity. Also several of his songs were written for the Student Choral Society, like He swinged on the Sea in 1835, Beautiful sound and Now green woods again, both in 1847, Little Karen and Do you remember the harvest in 1853.

His compositions are not at all witnesses of his considerable talent which has not yet been fully considered of merit by posterity. His larger compositions are the arms song of The corsair and his bride written in 1862, his Mourning Cantate of Frederik VII written over Christian Richardt's Long was the struggle and strive text, In distress and danger, At the Masonic Logens Consecration, and One day in spring for solo, chorus and orchestra, performed at the Music Society after his death. Hansen also wrote romances, piano music and music for Carit Etlar's Rørfuglen, performed on 29 March 1860 at the Folksteatret. In his manuscript, found in the Royal Danish Library, some of his piano pieces were dedicated to Frederik VII, such as Bagatelle en forme d'une valse, and Charakteristic Little Pieces Composed for Her grace Madam Baroness Danner.

== Notable works ==
- Seks romancer (1835)
- Ouverture i c-mol (ca. 1836)
- Ouverture i E-dur (1839)
- musik til C. Hostrups studenterkomedier
- Leonora di Massa Carrara (operetteparodi 1855)
- Kong Rosmer (operetteparodi 1857)
- En Søndag paa Alperne (operetteparodi)
- Vandmøllen i Apenninerne (operetteparodi 1874)
- Han gynged paa Havet (1835)
- Dejlige Øresund (1847)
- Nu grønnes Skoven atter (1847)
- Husker du i Høst (1853)
- Rørfuglen (syngespil 1860)
- Sørgekantate over Frederik 7. (1863)
- Bagatelle en forme d'une valse (piano)
- Charakteristiske Smaaestykker componerede for Hendes Naade Fru Baronesse Danner
- I Nød og Fare (1864)
- En Vaardag

== See also ==
- List of Danish composers

== Bibliography ==
- C. Thrane: Preface to Hansen's Concert Overture (1875).
- A. Sorensen: Students Choral Society. 1839-1889 (1889).
- Otto Zinck: Of my students and Theater Life (1906) OCLC 464170151
- Victor Hansen: A Danish Naval Officer. Rear Admiral V. Hansen's Memories (1927)
- N. M. Jensen: The Danish Intrigue (1964).
- Kai Aage Bruun: History of Danish II (1969) 145 18 Music Manuscript, in the Royal Library.
