= Tellef Øgrim =

Norwegian musician and journalist (born 1958)

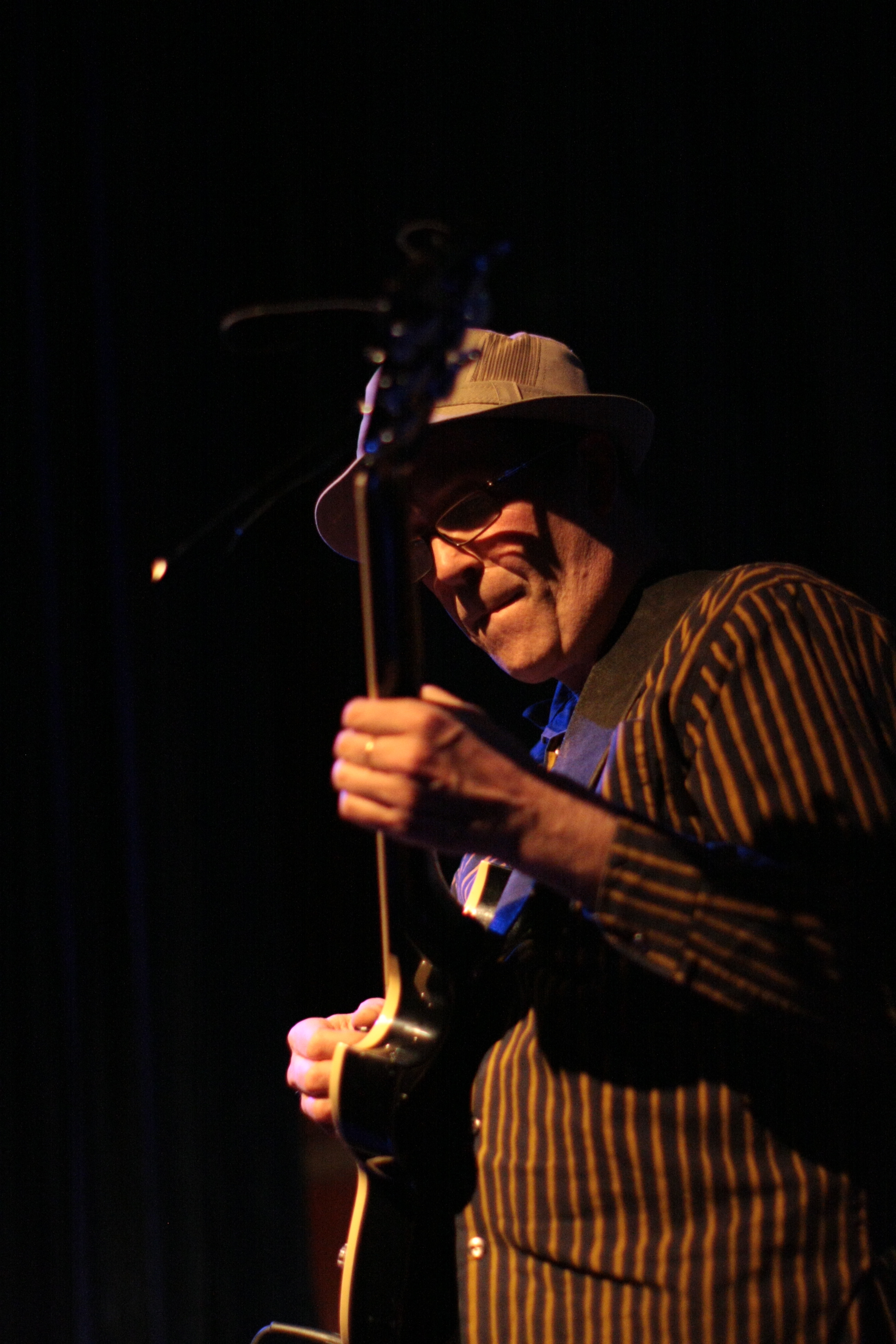
- Øgrim in 2008

Background information
- Born: 27 January 1958 (age 68); Oslo, Norway
- Origin: Ullern, Norway
- Genres: Jazz; rock; free jazz; contemporary art music
- Years active: 1981–present
- Website: tellefogrim.no

Tellef Øgrim (born 27 January 1958) is a Norwegian fretless guitarist, composer and journalist.

== Biography ==
He played in oboist Jan Wiese's band Bitihorn from 1976 and joined Ole Hedemann's Ung Pike Forsunnet (UPF) in 1981. UPF released two albums. In 1985, Øgrim and vocalist Anne Danielsen (later his wife) formed the soul-rock band Duck Spin, releasing the group's only album Wake me when the Moon gets up the year after. In 1987, Øgrim released the jazz-rock album Libido (Hot Club Records) with Henrik Hellstenius (keyb), Tore Eide (bs/cl) and Inge Norum (dr/prc).

During the same period, he wrote music for two theater plays staged by Piotr Cholodzinski.

In 2004, Øgrim released a CD containing improvisations for fretless electric guitar under the title Some Dodos Never Die and in 2007 the CD Wagon 8 was released on Curling Legs Records with Polish drummer Jacek Kochan, trombonist Dag Einar Eilertsen, Henrik Hellstenius (laptop) (one track) and singer Anne Danielsen (one track).

In 2008, Øgrim played on the free jazz CD Do I the In? (Not Two Records) where he played with Joe Fonda (bs), Jacek Kochan (dr) and Franz Hautzinger (trp). In 2010 he formed the music-live-video project Mugetuft with Peter Knudsen and Henrik Hellstenius and an improvisational trio with cello player Clementine Gasser and Jacek Kochan. This trio's first album was released by Not Two Records.

Since 2014, Øgrim has cooperated with Swedish bassist Anders Berg on several duo albums. Berg and Øgrim have gone on to create the record label Simlas that also has released Øgrim's solo album Fat Fit - Solos for Guitars. In January 2017, Øgrim went on to form a free jazz trio with Peeter Uuskyla and Anders Berg by releasing the album Ullr.

Øgrim has been a journalist since the late 1980s writing for the Norwegian Broadcasting Corporation (NRK), Dagens Naeringsliv, Ballade and Oslo Business Memo, and Oslo Innovation Magazine and Blue Frontier Magazine. He also is a speaker on topics relating to art and technology.
