= Badstuestræde =

Street in Copenhagen

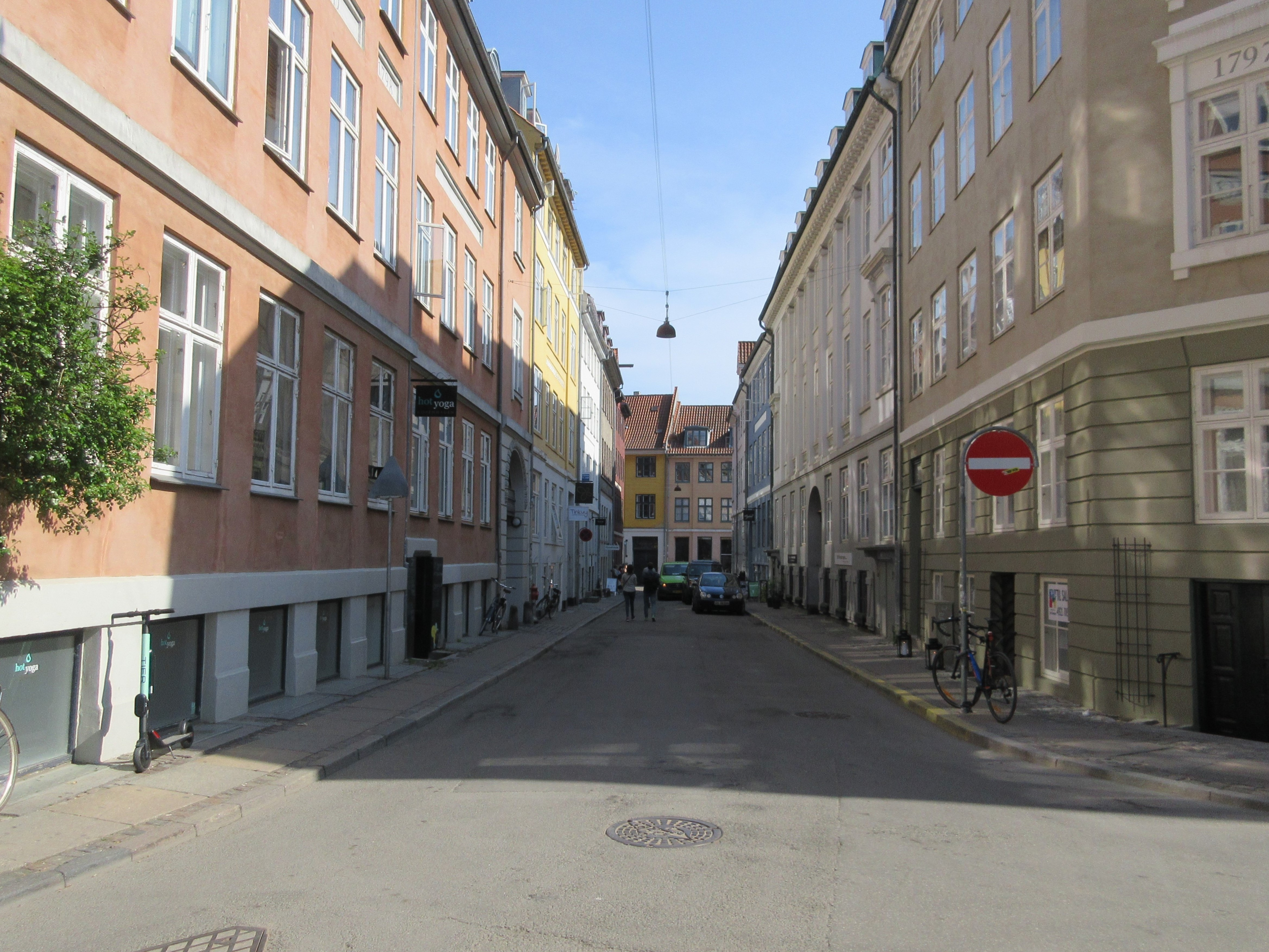
- Badstuestræde
- Length: 164 m (538 ft)
- Location: Indre By, Copenhagen, Denmark
- Postal code: 1209
- Coordinates: 55°40′41.16″N 12°34′31.08″E

Badstuestræde is a street in the Old Town of Copenhagen, Denmark, linking the pedestrian street Strøget in the north with Kompagnistræde in the south. Brolæggerstræde end in the street. Most of the buildings in the street date from the years after the Copenhagen Fire of 1795.

== History ==
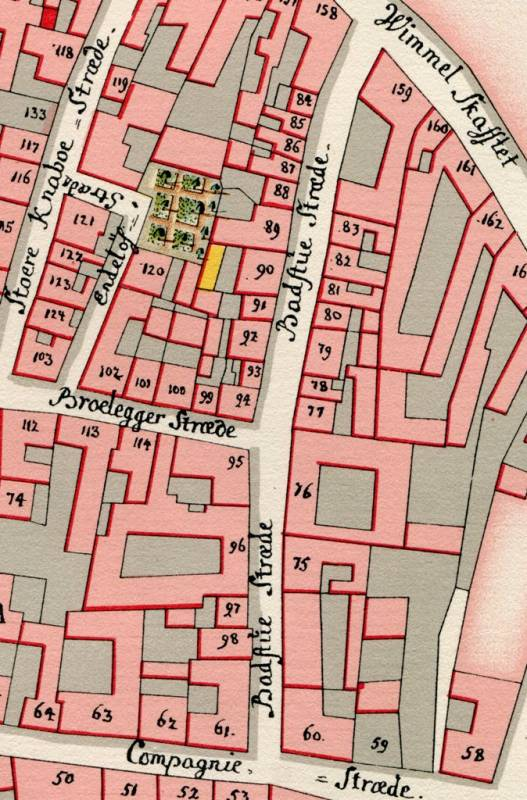
Badstuestræde seen on Gedde's map of Copenhagen

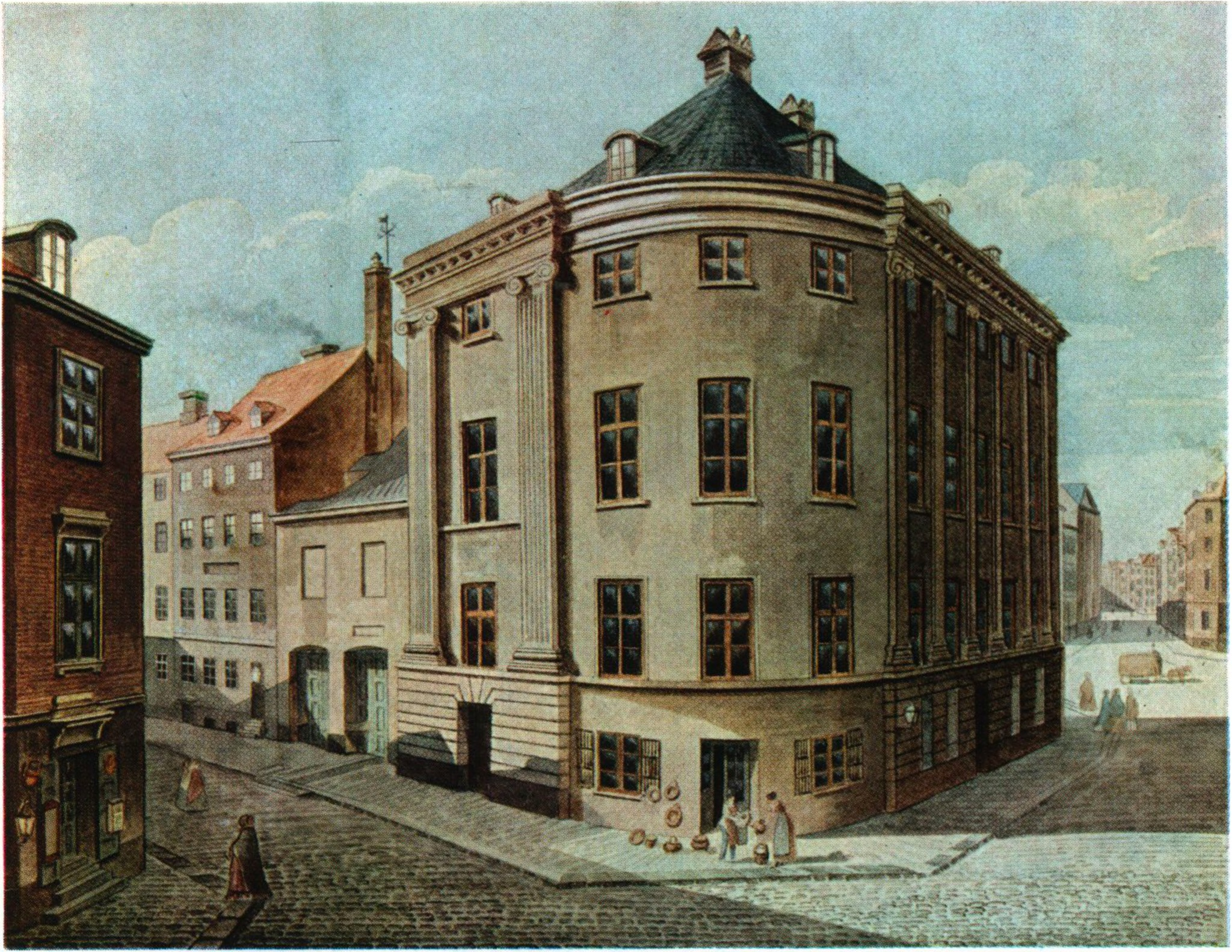
The Frederik Tuteins House at the corner with Strøget in the 19th century

Badstuestræde is first mentioned in the Toskilde Bishops' Census Book from 1377. It was home to a row of market stalls that were moved to Købmagergade in about 1400. The street was named for a public bath house located at its southern end. It was one of three such public bath houses in the city at that time. The two others were located in Vestergade and at St Nicolas' Church. The House of the Holy Ghost in Niels Hemmingsens Gade had its own, private bath house. In 1496, the street was referred to as Strandbadstræde ("Beach Bath Alley"). The bath house was closed in 1509 but the street kept its name which was shortened to Badstuestræde in the 1740s. The street was completely destroyed in the Copenhagen Fire of 1795 but rebuilt over the next few years.

== Notable buildings and structures ==
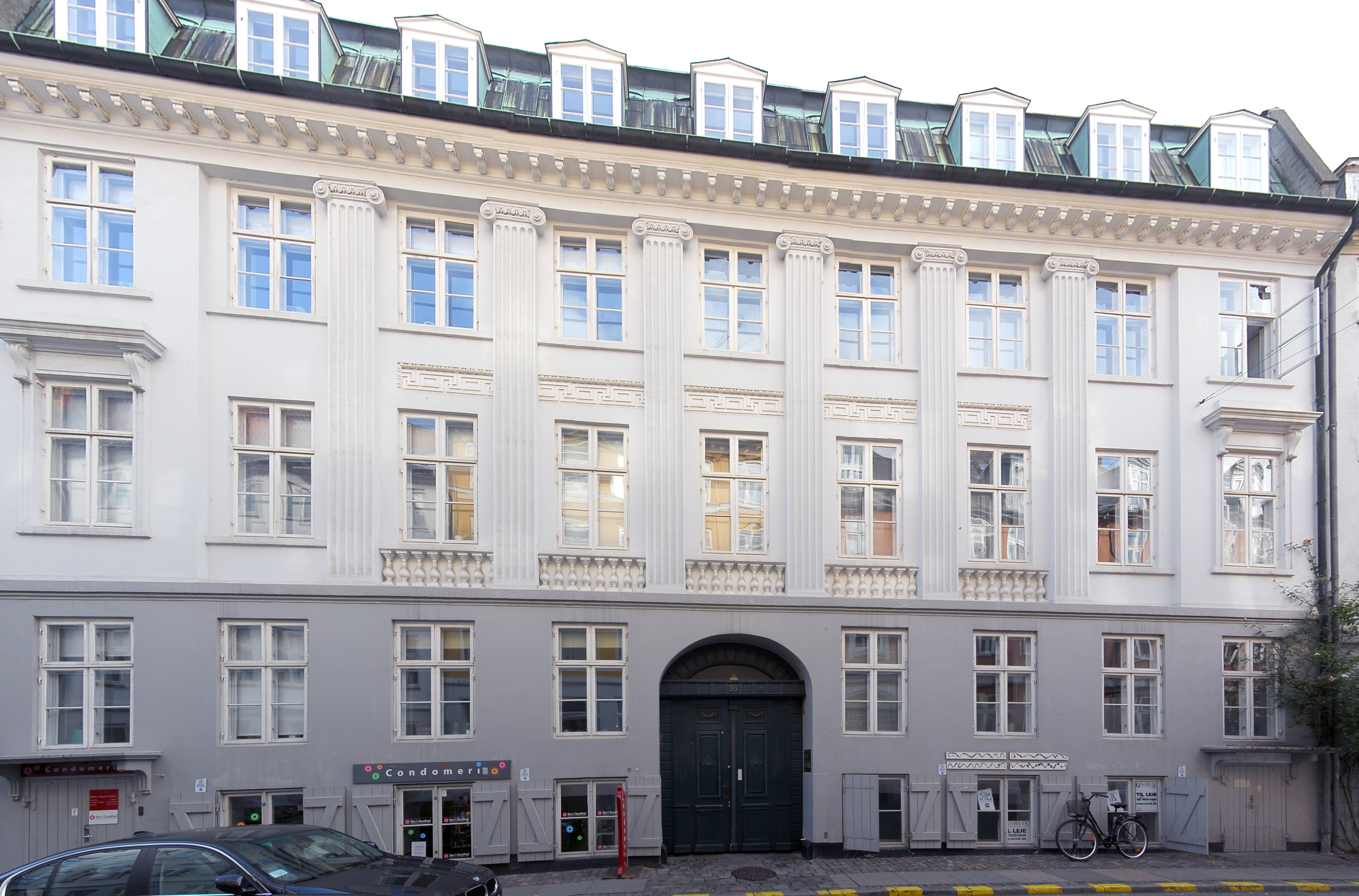
No. 18

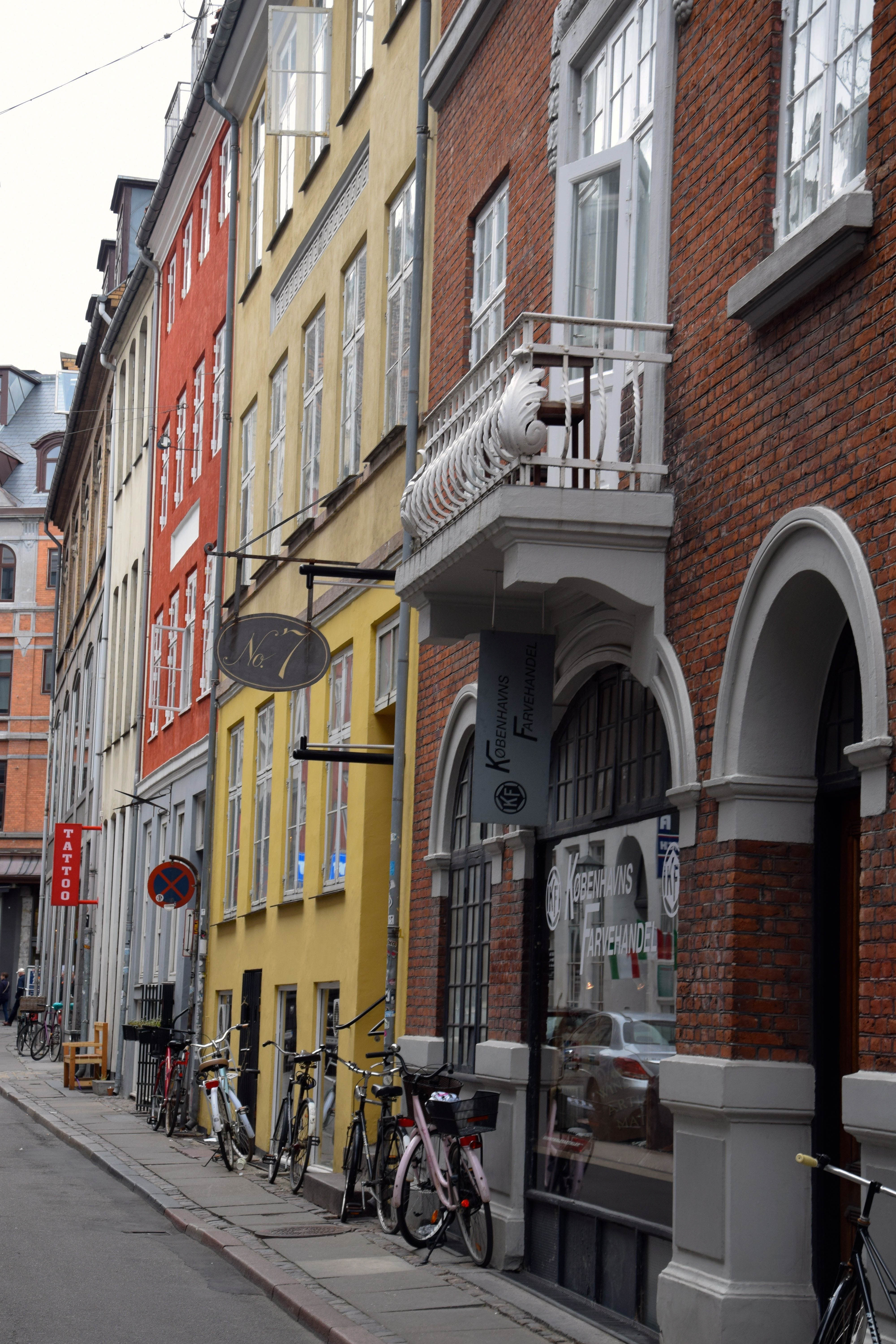
Facades

Most of the buildings in the street date from the late 1790s or early 1800s. The Frederik Tutein House on the corner with Strøget (Badstuestræde 2 / Vimmelskaftet 47) was built for Frederik Tutein in 1801 to design by Johan Martin Quist. The rounded corner is typical of Quist's works from the period. The newspaper Kristeligt Dagblad is based in the building on the first and second floor.

Mp. 8 (1797–1798), No. 10 (1798–1799), No. 12 (1799–1800), Bo. 15 (1798–1802), No. 16 (1797), No. 17 (1829–1832), No. 18 (1796–1797) and No. 20 (1796–1797) are all listed. No. 18 is decorated with Ionic order pilasters.

Margrethe-Skolen, a school of fashion and design, is located on the second floor at No. 1-3.

== Commemorative plaque ==
A plaque on No. 17 commemorates that the linguist Rasmus Rask died in the building on 15 November 1843.
