= Philip Heyman =

Danish merchant (1837–1893)

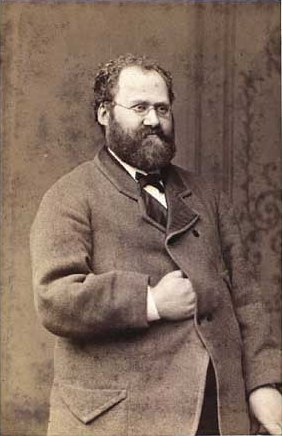
- Heyman photographed by E. Bieber
- Born: 5 November 1837; Copenhagen, Denmark
- Died: 15 December 1893 (aged 56); Copenhagen, Denmark
- Occupation: Industrialist
- Awards: Knight of the Dannebrog

Philip Wulff Heyman (5 November 1837 – 15 December 1893) was a Jewish Danish industrialist who co-founded the Tuborg Brewery. He was also a pioneer of Danish butter and bacon exports to the United Kingdom.

== Early life ==
Heyman was born on 5 November 1837 in Copenhagen, the son of merchant Wulff Philip Heyman (1794–1866) and his second wife Jacobine Meyer (1812–73). He had five brothers and sisters, including Isaac Wulff Heyman. The family lived on Nytorv (No. 89, old number). He attended Melchiors Borgerskole from 1854.

== Career ==
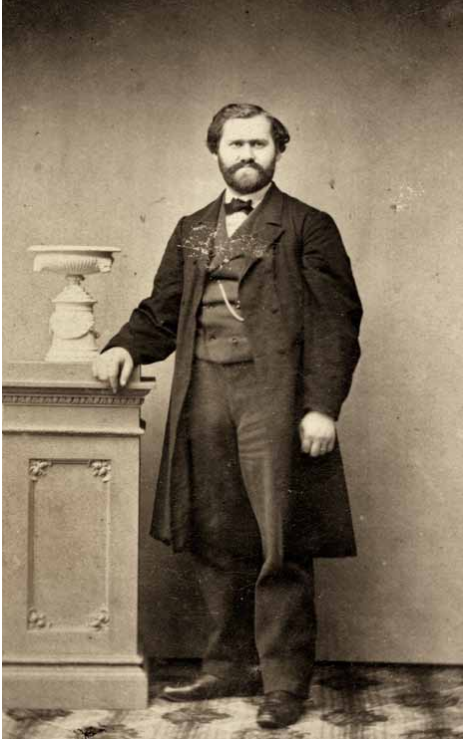
Philip Heyman

In 1858 Heyman established himself as a commodity broker of grain, butter and other food products. In 1861, he was granted citizenship as a merchant (grosserer). He was one of the merchants, who made Denmark's foreign trade independent of Hamburg in the years after 1864. When a regular service with steam liners was introduced between Copenhagen and England and Scotland in 1863, he began an export of Danish quality butter in original packaging to the United Kingdom. In 1864, he was the first in Denmark to establish a production of canned quality butter for sale to overseas markets.

In 1866, with H. Puggaard & Co. as a silent partner, he established an abattoir, Kjøbenhavns Svineslagteri, specializing in the slaughtering of pigs for the British market. It was located at Strandboulevarden 134 in Østerbro and was inaugurated just one year after the first facility of its kind in Copenhagen had opened at Bodenhoffs Plads.

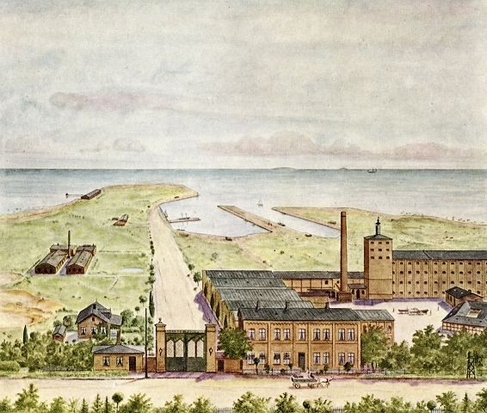
Tuborg Industries circa 1880

In 1873, together with C. F. Tietgen, Gustav Brock and Rudolph Puggaard, he went on to found Tuborgs Fabrikker in Hellerup on the coast north of Copenhagen. The activities included Tuborg Brewery, a fertilizer and sulfuric acid plant, and a glassworks. Heyman left the board in 1875 due to disagreements regarding its management, but took over as managing director and chairman in 1880.

In the 1880s, Heyman expanded his pork meat business through the opening or acquisition of a number of new abattoirs. Two of these, one in Varde (Varde Svineslagteri) and one in Assens (Fyns Svineslagteri), were opened in 1883. In 1880, with local partners, he established the Engelska Svineslagteriet ("English Pig Slaughterhouse") in Malmö, later followed by a smaller branch under the same name in Tomelilla. He also acquired the abattoir in Maribo (Maribo Svineslagteri) as well as significant stakes in the abattoirs in Aalborg and Hjørring (Hjørring Svineslagteri), Vejle (Vejle Amts Svineslagteri) and Skælskør (Skjelskør og Omegns Svineslagteri).

In 1890–1891, together with British partners, he established an abattoir in Waterford, Ireland, but pulled out when it did not perform as expected. Starting in the late 1890s, Heyman worked for the merger of all Danish abattoirs, both privately owned and co-operatives, into a single company, A/S De danske Svineslagterier, and after a few years he was joined by C. F. Tietgen who had already instigated similar mergers within a number of other industries, but the co-operatives ended up creating their own company under the name Slagteriselskabet Danmark.

== Personal life ==
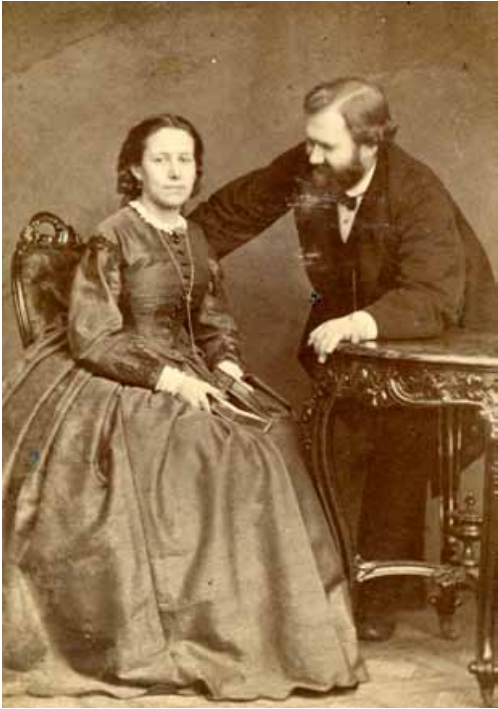
Philip and Hanne Heyma

Heyman married Hanne Emilie Adler (28 February 1839 – 31 January 1917), daughter of dyer David Simon Adler (1804–1869) and Wilhelmine Meyer (1807–1878), on 9 July 1862 in Copenhagen. They moved into a large apartment at Store Kongensgade 11. In 1870 they moved to the house Kristianslund on Strandvejen (No. 11, old number). They had 10 children, of whom nine survived infancy.

He was created a Knight in the Order of the Dannebrog in 1885 and appointed etatsråd in 1892. He is one of the businessmen depicted in Peder Severin Krøyer's monumental 1895 group portrait painting From Copenhagen Stock Exchange in Børsen.

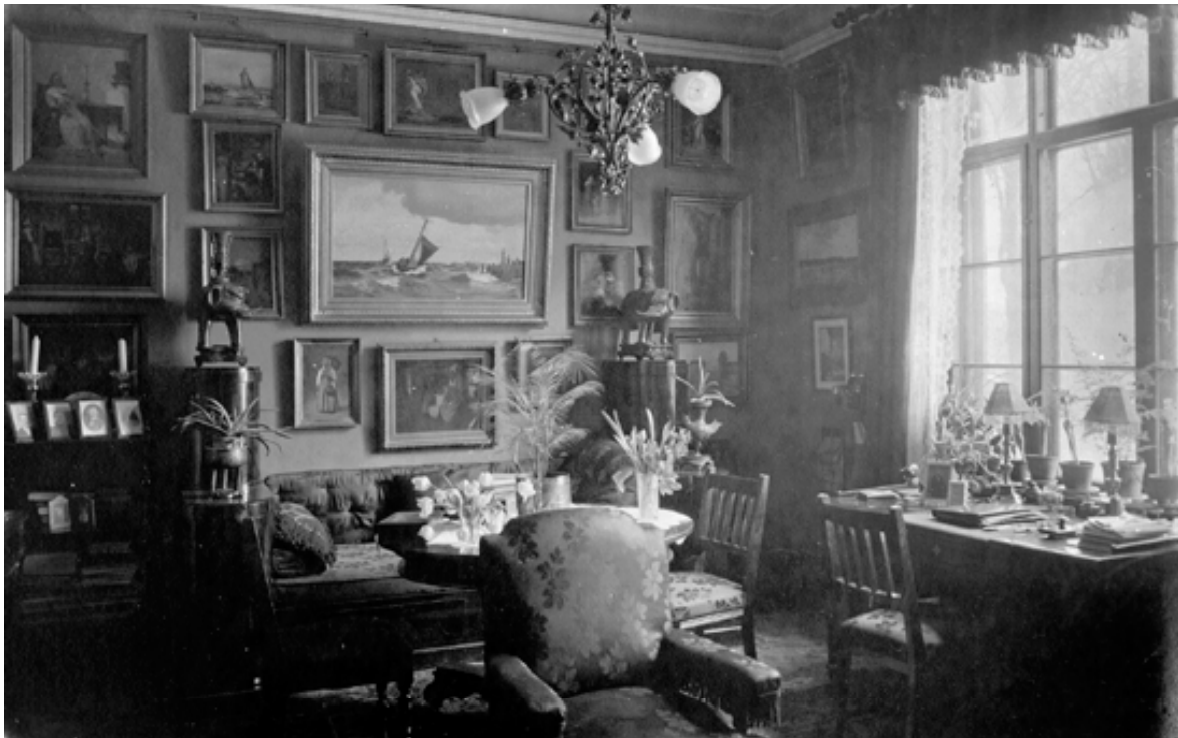
Heyman's home at Kristianslund

He died on 15 December 1893 and is buried at the Western Jewish Cemetery in Copenhagen. Tuborg Brewery merged with De Forenede Bryggerier in 1894. His son-in-law, Benny Dessau, was CEO of the company. The company Philip W. Heyman was continued by his widow and son Aage Philip Heyman.

Another daughter, Gerda Heyman, was a sculptor. She married the painter Charles William Madvig (1874–1940). A third daughter, Jenny, married the painter Georg Seligmann. Philip Heimans Allé, a street in Hellerup, is named after him.

== See also ==
- Philip W. Heyman
