= Isaac Wulff Heyman =

Danish businessman and philanthropist (1818–1884)

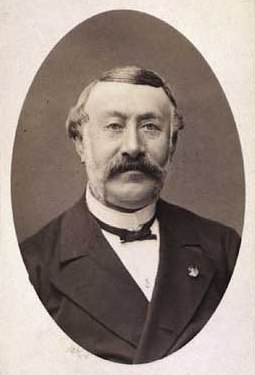
- Halberstadt
- Born: 1 November 1818; Copenhagen, Denmark
- Died: 19 June 1884 (aged 65); Copenhagen, Denmark
- Occupation: Businessman

Isaac Wulff Heyman (1 November 1818 – 19 June 1884) was a Danish businessman and philanthropist. He was the elder half-brother of Tuborg Brewery founder Philip Heyman.

== Early life ==
Heyman was born in Copenhagen, the son of Wulff Philip Heyman (1794–1866) and Gittel Isaac Moses (c. 1792–1833). His father was after the mother's early death married second time to Jacobine Meyer (1812–1873) in 1835.

== Career ==
Heyman was just 18 years old when he started his own brokerage firm in a partnership with I. M. Levin, benefitting from favourable market conditions prior to leaving it again in 1849. He worked as a broker for a few more years but increasingly engaged in real estate investments, development projects and industrial enterprises. In 1853, he established the Svanholm Brewery on Gammel Kongevej in a partnership with his father. He also founded the Sophiehaab chemical factory and was for a while co-owner of Christianshavn Steam Mill. He was vice chairman of Copenhagen's Association of Landowners from 1865 to 1881 and its chairman from 1881 to 1884.

Heyman acquired Roskilde Distilleries in a partnership with C. A. Olesen in 1878 and modernized the factory prior to its merger with other similar factories under the name De Danske Spritfabrikker in 1881.

He was a co-founder of Industribanken in 1862 and was a member of its board of representatives until 1880, the last three years as its chairman.

== Politics and public offices ==
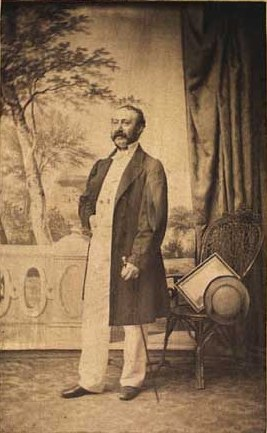
Heyman photographed by Georg Emil Hansen in 1861

Heyman was a member of the Copenhagen City Council from 1871 to 1880. He was also very active in the Jewish community, for instance as a board member and chairman of several of its philanthropical societies.

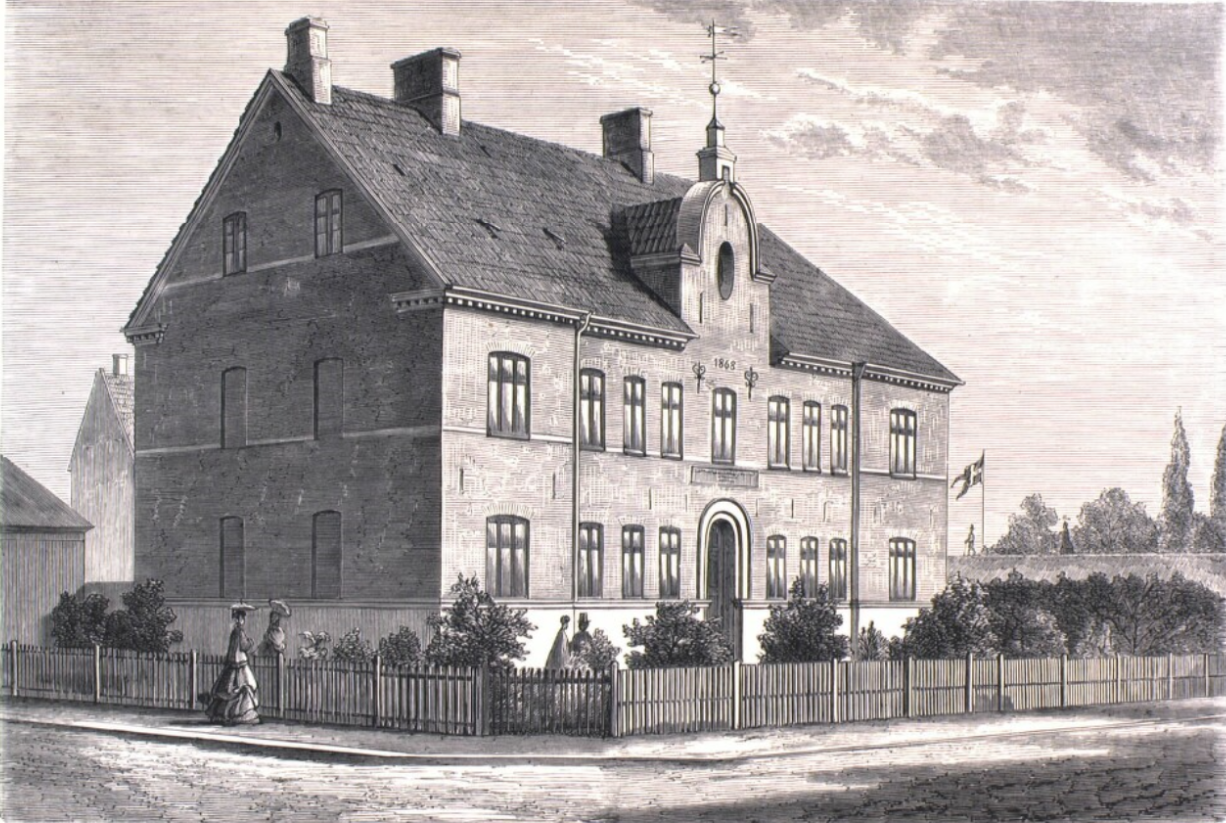
J. V. Heyman og Hustrus Stiftelse for Officersenker at Viktoriagade 19

He founded I.W. Heymans og Hustrus Sølvbryllups Stiftelse in connection with his and his wife's silver wedding anniversary in 1871. It was located at Peder Hvitfeldts Stræde 8 and contained residences for "good and indigent unmarried people". It existed until 1971. It was in 1869 followed by J. V. Heyman og Hustrus Stiftelse for Officersenker at Viktoriagade 19 with five residents for officers' widows. The building was demolished in 1895. He also created a number of grants.

== Personal life ==
On 5 July 1846 in Hamburg, Heiman married to Johanna Levysohn (27 June 1824 – 11 October 1885), daughter of the merchant Joachim Levysohn (died 1857) and Betty Isaac. He was made a Knight in the Order of the Dannebrog in 1865 and was awarded the Cross of Honour in 1869. He died on 19 June 1884 and is buried at the Jewish North Cemetery.
