= Gerda Madvig =

Danish painter and sculptor (1868–1940)

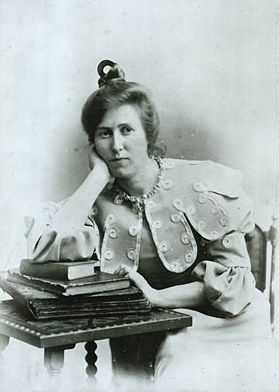
- Madvig in the 1880s
- Born: Gerda Heyman; 14 April 1868; Copenhagen, Denmark
- Died: 10 September 1940 (aged 72); Charlottenlund, Denmark
- Known for: Sculpture, painting
- Movement: Realism, Impressionism
- Spouse: Charles William Madvig
- Children: Edith Madvig Fersing

Gerda Madvig (14 April 1868 – 10 September 1940) was a Danish painter and sculptor.

== Biography ==
Gerda Madvig was born Gerda Heyman in Copenhagen to the Jewish-Danish industrialist and etatsråd Philip Wulff Heyman, co-founder of Tuborg Brewery and pioneer of Danish butter and bacon exports, and his wife Hanne Emilie Adler, both Danish Jews with roots in Germany.

=== Career ===
Madvig learned to draw with the painter and illustrator Carl Thomsen, and then to model with professor August Saabye, with whom she worked for roughly five years. In 1892, she exhibited at the annual Charlottenborg Spring Exhibition her first piece, En kvinde, and in 1893 Sovende barn. Later, modeled a body-sized figure, called Asra and some busts, among others, one of her sister Jenny, who was married to the painter Georg Seligmann.

Madvig also played music and gave concerts in Paris, where she lived from 1903 until shortly before her death.

==== Style ====
Madvig used especially family members as models, but also famous people, both contemporaries, like professor Julius Petersen, and deceased, such as the composer Frédéric Chopin. As a sculptor, she was a naturalist, while her painting was mostly influenced by French Impressionism.

== Personal life ==
She married the painter Charles William Madvig on 16 May 1905, in Paris. They had one daughter, art dealer Edith Madvig Fersing.

=== Death ===
Madvig died in Charlottenlund, Denmark, in 1940. She is buried at Hellerup Cemetery.

== Works ==
=== Sculpture ===
- En kvinde ("A woman", 1892)
- Sovende barn ("Sleeping Child", 1893)
- Moderen (relief, 1902–03)
- Asra (figure)
- Dyrestatuetter (bronze)
- La vigilance (bronze, ca. 1937)
- Kristus (1938)
- Statuetter af datteren Edith

=== Busts ===
- Julius Petersen (plaster, University of Copenhagen)
- Jenny Seligmann, born Heyman
- Hanne Heyman (marble)
- Jens Ferdinand Willumsen (Paris, 1904)
- Frédéric Chopin (1933)
- Roger Garreau
- Charles Madvig
- Pierre d'Arquennes (who headed the École Normale de Musique de Paris before Pierre Petit).
- Aage Louis Dessau

=== Paintings ===
- Fiskehavn i Nordfrankrig (exhibited in 1928)
