= Jomfru Ane Gade =

Street in Aalborg, Denmark

Coordinates: 57.0504°N 9.9190°E

Jomfru Ane Gade, Aalborg

Jomfru Ane Gade (English: Virgin Anne's Street), colloquially known as Gaden (English: the street), is a well known street in the city of Aalborg, Denmark. It has gained popularity for the restaurants and pubs lining both sides of the street. It represents one of the longest continuous stretches of restaurants and bars in Denmark, only surpassed by a few areas in Aarhus and Copenhagen. On warm summer evenings, the terraces and restaurants fill up and then, as night falls, crowds of young people walk the street until they finally end up in one of the many discothèques. As of 2012, the street was said to have a turnover of approximately 300 million Danish kroner per year.

The street is a major tourist attraction within Aalborg and is said to be associated with the city's brand.

== History ==
The street dates back at least until the end of the 16th century, apparently named after Ane Viffert who in 1568 lived in nearby Skavegade. She is said to have been a nun at Ø Kloster on Limfjorden. For the next 200 years, the street housed the homes of several merchants. Some of their half-timbered houses can still be seen.

The first discotheque, the Gaslight, was opened in May 1967 by Jørgen Steffensen, who had been inspired by a visit to a dance hall on a trip to Italy. As a result of its success, the Fyrtøjet opened the following year. By the end of the 1970s, there were another 10 pubs and restaurants, and by 1992, there were 26.

In recent years, concerns had been raised regarding the security on the street following a spate of crimes, including a stabbing on the street in 2007. In response, North Jutland police began deploying facial recognition technology on the street in 2007. In 2022, a volunteer-run safe house premises opened on the street, where visitors can rest or have a glass of water. The safe house featured on a TV2 Nord documentary in 2024. In 2024, bollards were placed on the street as a preventative measure against potential terrorism.

The street is famous for its hosting of J-dag, the November celebration during which Tuborg Brewery launch their Christmas beer.
