= J-Day =

J-Day may refer to:

- J Day, an annual rally held at different locations across the planet
- J-Day (military designation), used during both world wars to designate the day an assault occurred
- J-dag, day when the Tuborg Brewery releases their Christmas brew
