= Christopher Puggaard =

Danish geologist (1823–1864)

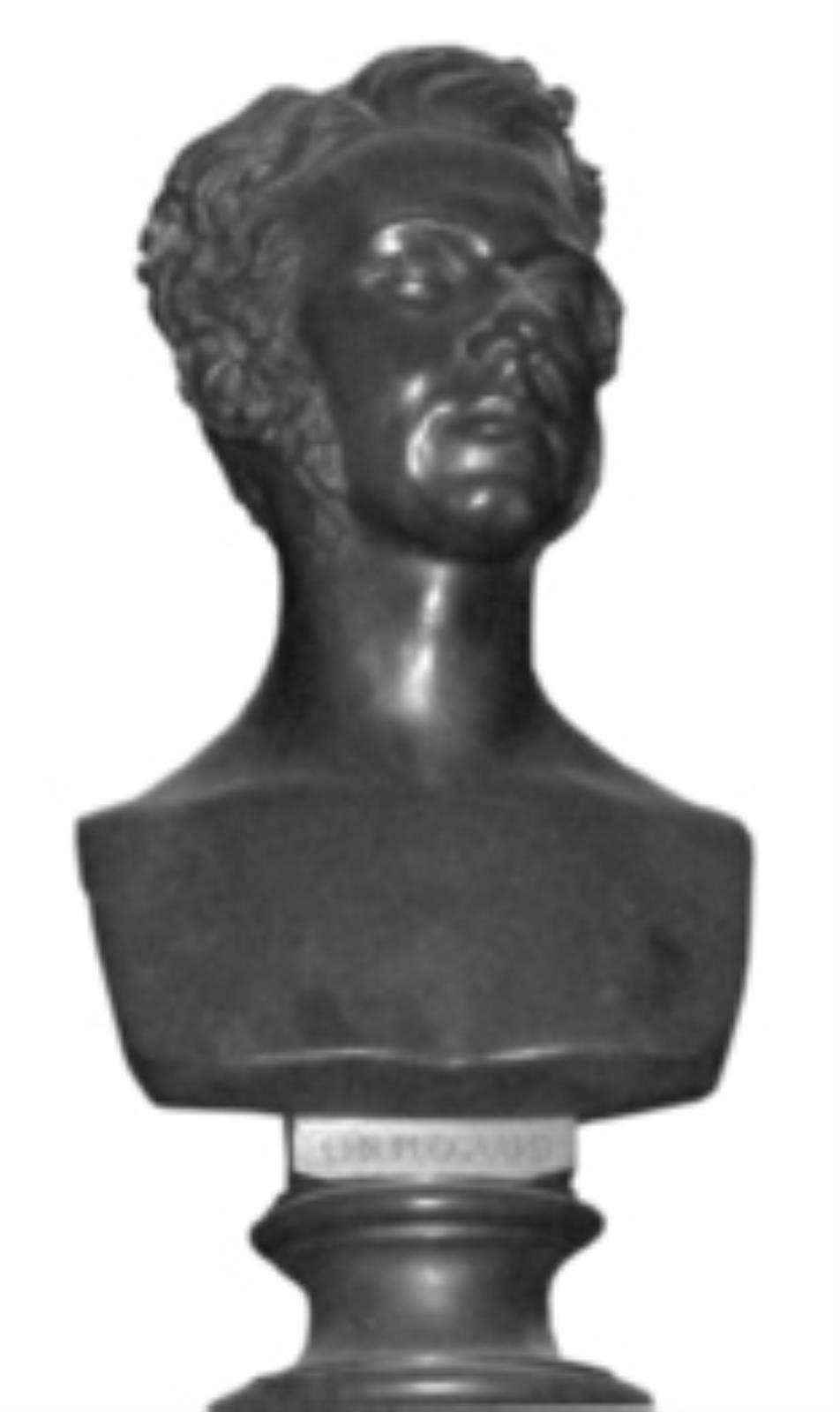
Bust of Christopher Puggaard by Herman Wilhelm Bissen (1857)

Christopher Puggaard (or Hans Christopher Wilhelm Puggaard, born on 23 May 1823 in Copenhagen, and died on 14 August 1864 in Caen, Normandy) was a Danish geologist.

== Early life and education ==
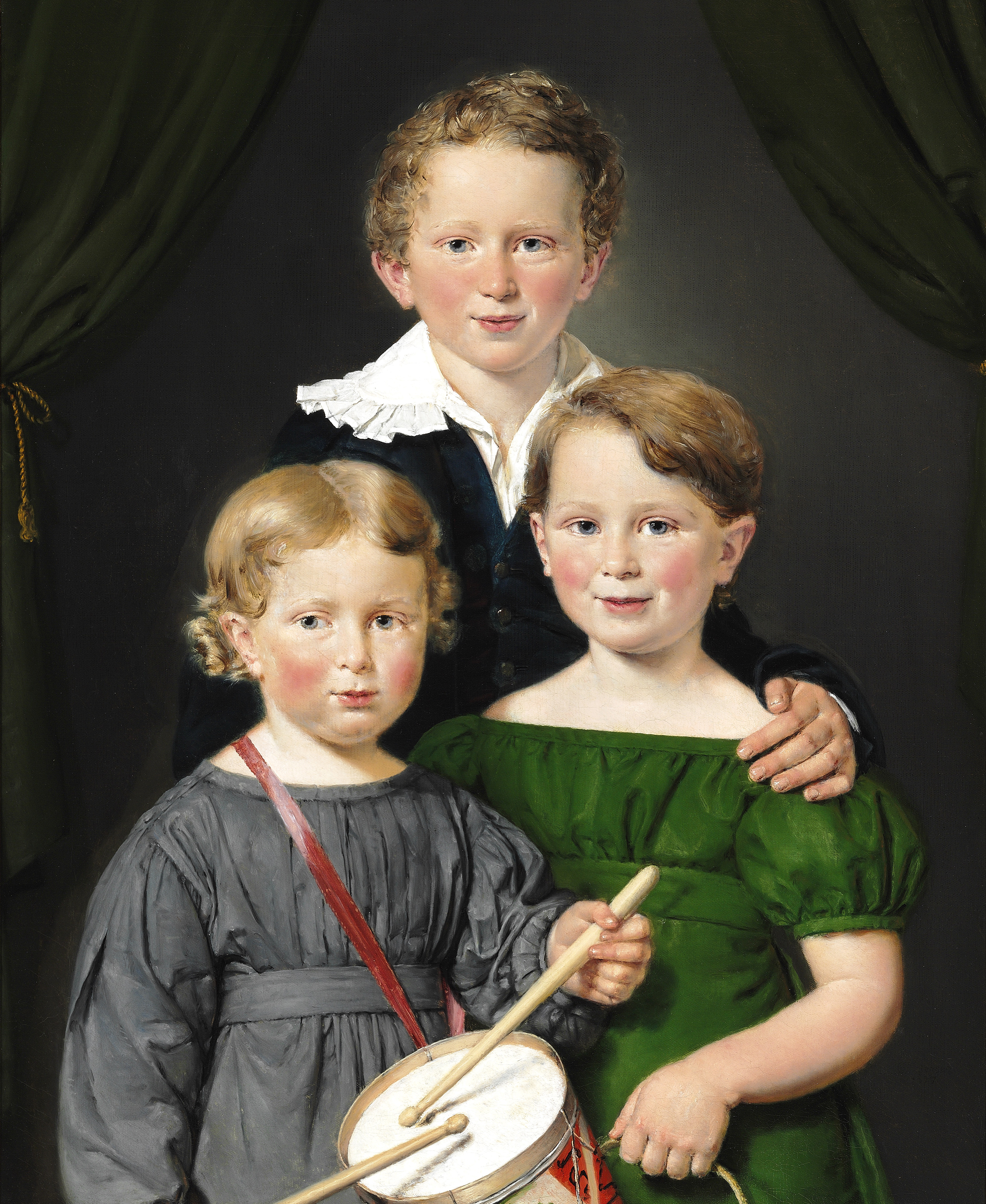
Puggaard and his two siblins painted by Christian Albrecht Jensen (1857)

Puggaard was born on 23 May 1923 in Copenhagen, the son of the son of Hans and Bolette Puggaard. His elder brother was the later businessman Rudolph Puggaard. He studied at Roskilde Cathedral School, whereupon he studied in the polytechnic school and got his diploma in natural science in 1846. He was fascinated in particular by the classes of the country's leading geologist, Johan Georg Forchhammer. He travelled then to further his studies in England and Paris and later Italy, together with his friend the painter Wilhelm Marstrand.

== Career ==
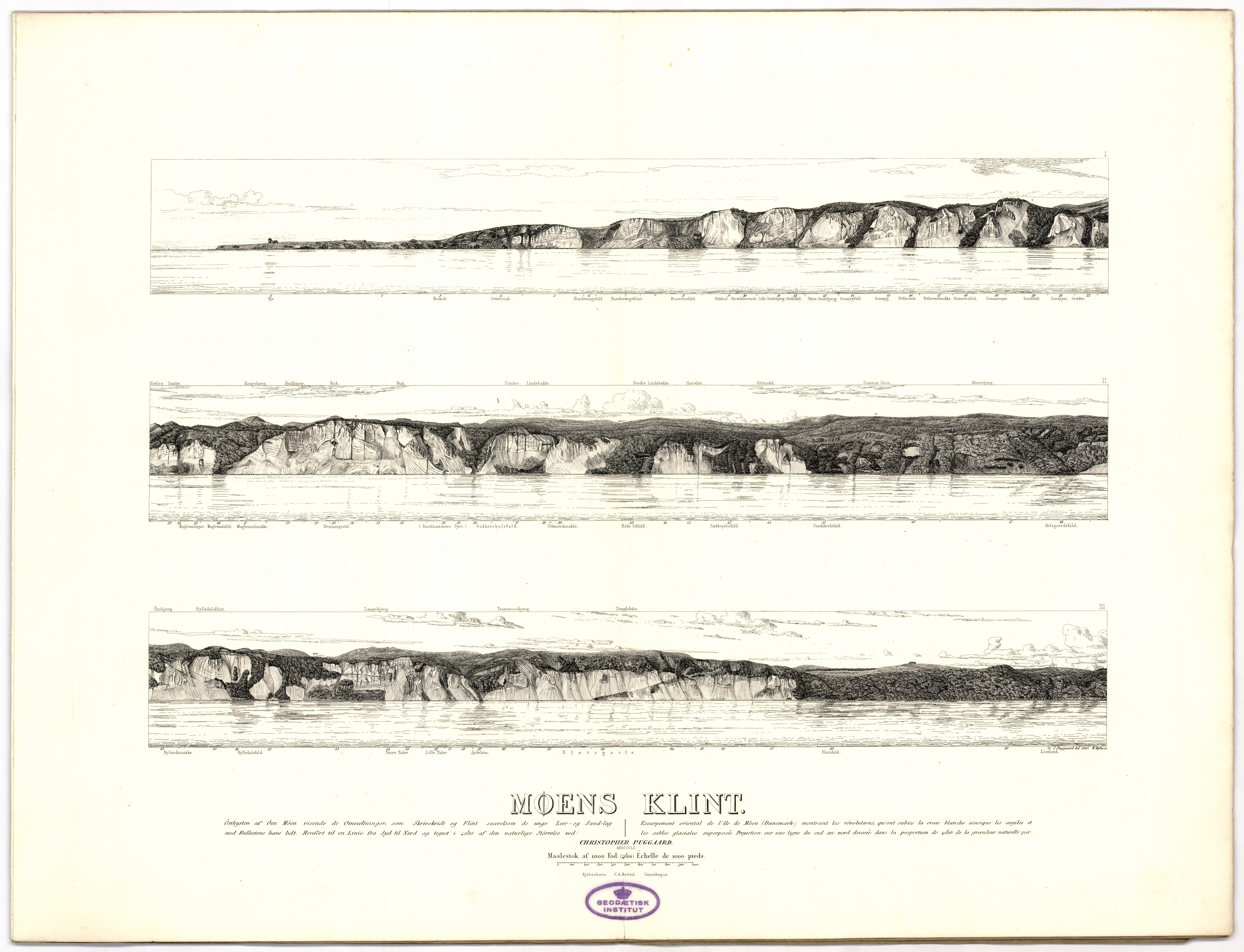
Illustration from one of Puggaard's publications

In 1851, Puggaard published in Danish his book on the geology of the Island of Møn (Möens Geologie. Populært fremstillet. Tillige som Veiviser for Besögende af Möens Klint) which was rewarded with the gold medal of the University of Copenhagen. The book was later slightly changed and translated into German under the title Geologie der Insel Möen. Following this publication, the University of Bern gave him the title of Doctor in Philosophy. The book was illustrated by some of the best painters of the Danish Golden age, such as Christoffer Wilhelm Eckersberg, P.C. Skovgaard and Vilhelm Kyhn.

Based on the sedimentary layers and fossils, Puggaard provides a fantastic narrative on how our planet developed from a globe of fluid stone into the progressive development of life. After being submerged in an ocean inhabited with tropical species, the site of Møn became covered by an Arctic Ocean with icebergs, and finally emerged as a wooded island populated by Stone Age men and mammoths. In this regard his views were opposed to Forchhammers and ahead of their time.

Puggaard also later published various contributions on the geology of the Sorrento Peninsula and the Alps.

Puggaard died young, while doing research on the cliffs in Normandy.

== Personal life ==
Puggaard was married to Louise Henriette Amalie Wormstrup (1817–1911). They had three daughters: Clara Louise Pauline Puggaard. Alice Helene Puggaard and Gerda Puggaard. Puggaard lived in the Hjuleberg Manor in Halland, Sweden. He was the grandfather of novelist Jacob Paludan.

The Puggaard Stone, a giant stone located in the water off Møns Klint, is named after him.

== Bibliography ==
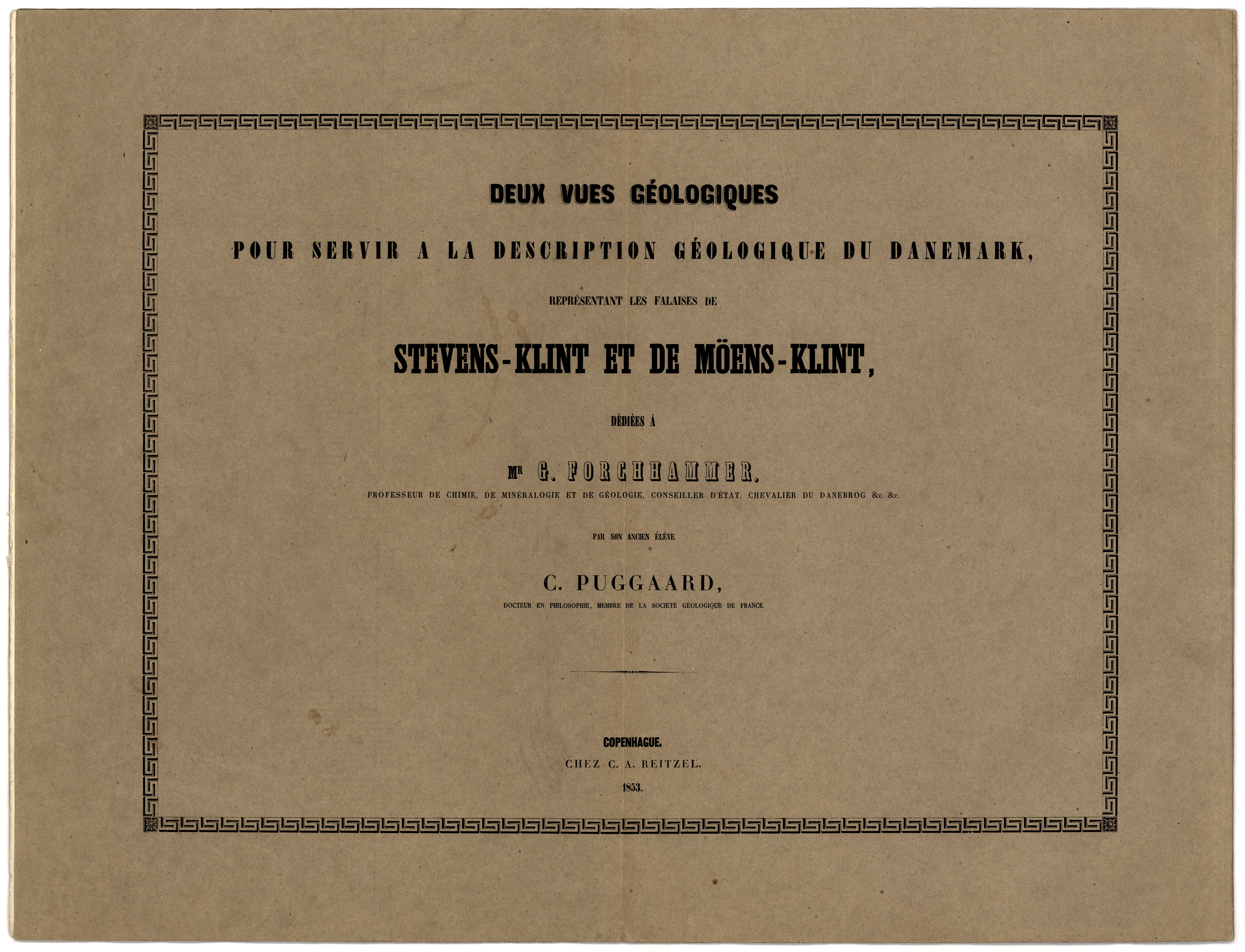
To geologiske Billeder af Stevns Klint og Möens Klint, et bidrag til Danmarks geognostiske Physiognomik

- Puggaard, Hans Kristofer Wilhelm, in Carl Frederik Bricka, Dansk Biografisk Leksikon (1st edition, 1899)
- Puggaard, Hans Christopher Vilhelm, in Nordisk familjebok (2nd edition, 1915)
- Puggaard, Hans Christopher Wilhelm, in Salmonsens Konversationsleksikon (2nd edition, 1925)
- Puggaard, Christopher, Description Géologique de la Peninsule de Sorrento (1858).
- Puggaard, Christopher, Geologie Der Insel Möen. (German Edition) – reedition in paperback September 22, 2011.
- Puggaard, Christopher, Möens Geologie, C.A. Reitzel, København 1851, XXXII and 286 pages, with 12 plates of which 7 coloured by hand and 55 etchings.
