= Nyhavn 43 =

Building in Copenhagen

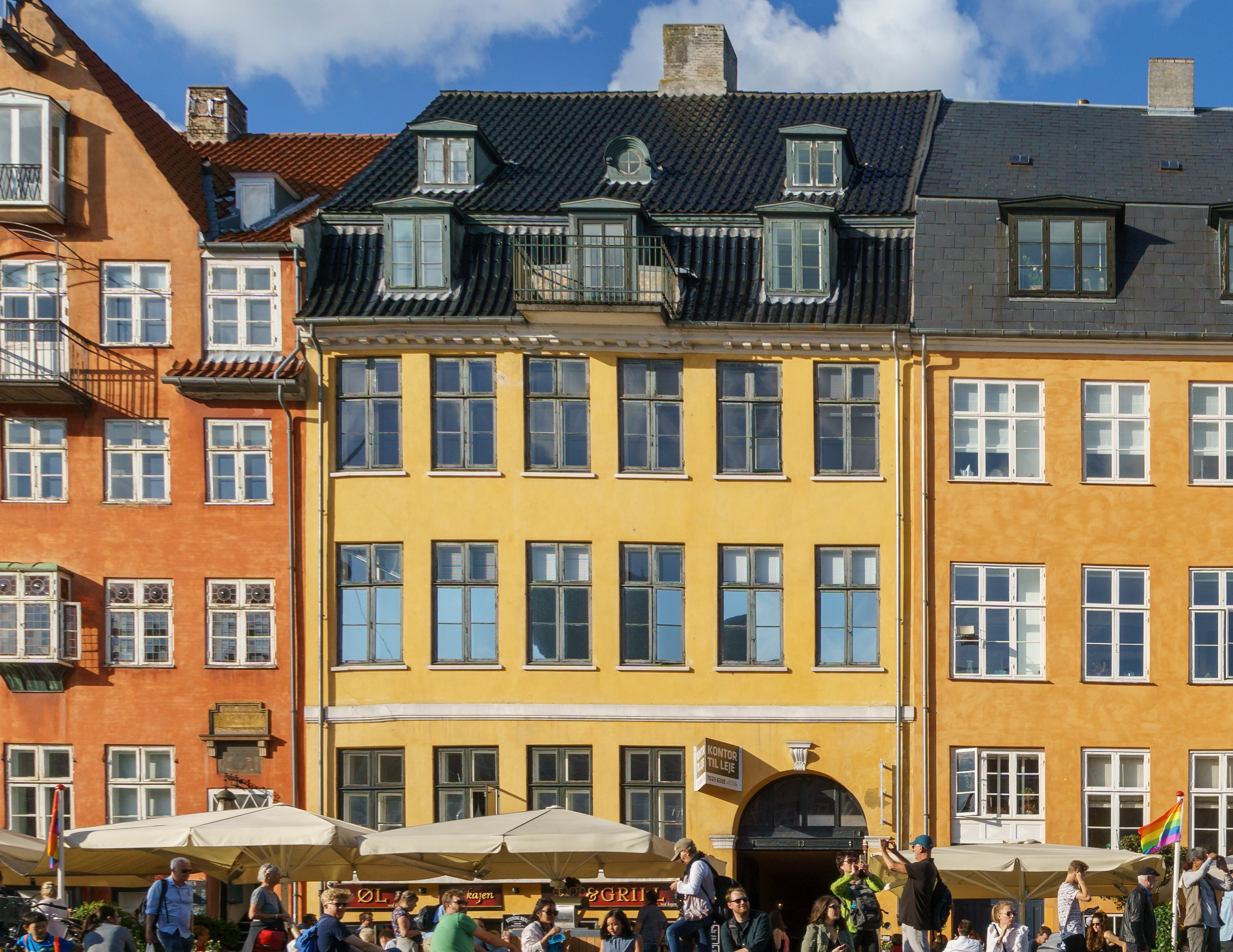
- The house seen from the other side of the canal
- Interactive map of the Nyhavn 43 area

General information
- Location: Copenhagen, Denmark
- Coordinates: 55°40′48.14″N 12°35′27.44″E
- Completed: Before 1788

Nyhavn 43 is a historic townhouse overlooking the Nyhavn Canal in central Copenhagen, Denmark. The building was listed on the Danish registry of protected buildings and places in 1945. It was refurbished in 1987.

Today, the building is owned by Matorion, a property company owned by Bent Fabricius-Bjerre and his two sons. Restaurant Ved Kajen (Danish: By the Quay) is located on the ground floor; its name refers to the title of an Osvald Helmuth song.

== History ==
=== Early history ===
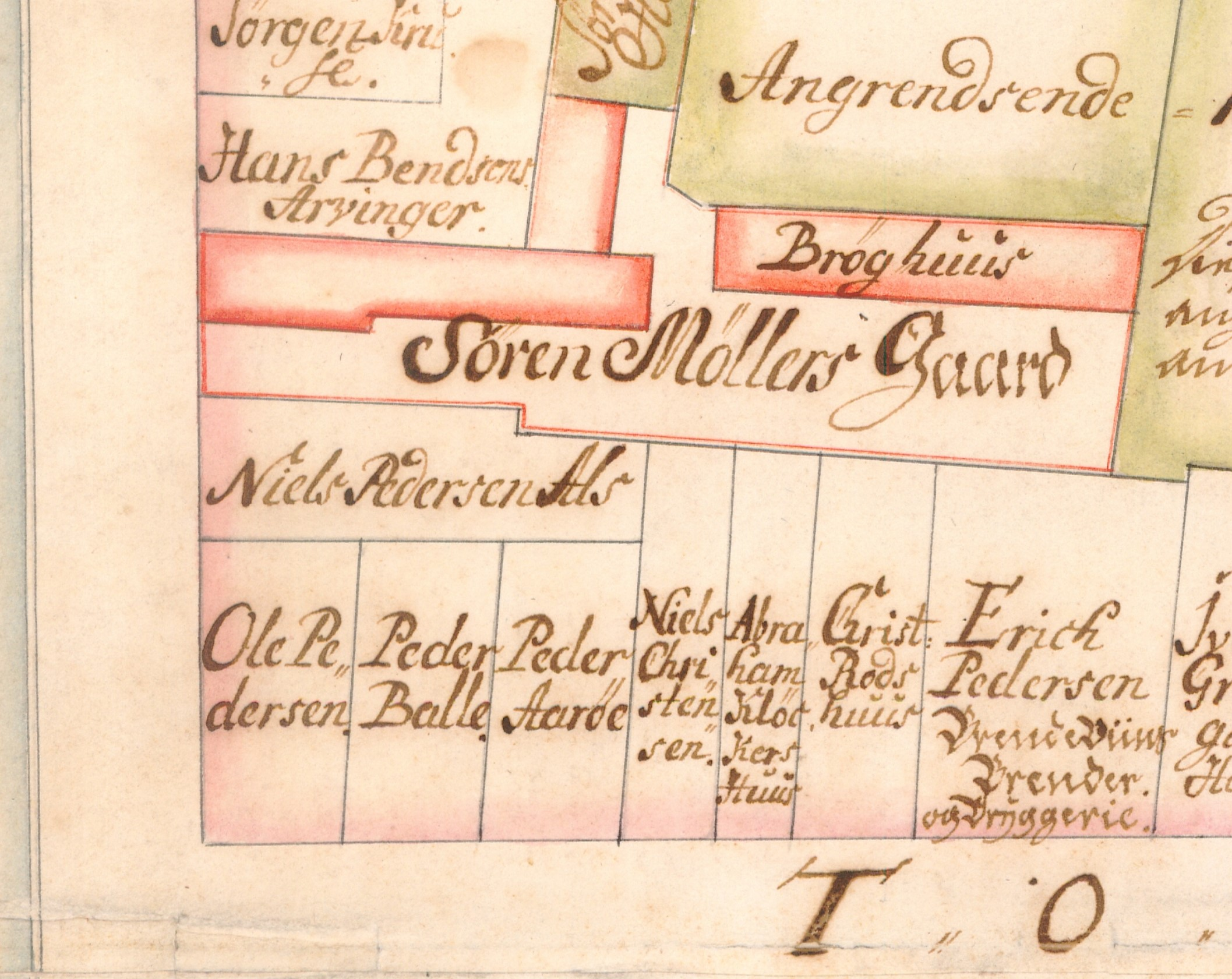
The property seen on a plan from 1731

The properties now known as Nyhavn 41–47 were formerly part of the same property. This property was listed in Copenhagen's first cadastre from 1578 as No. 28 in St. Ann's East Quarter, owned by tanner Villum Lydersen. In c. 1730, it was divided into four smaller properties. Toldbodgade was also continued southwards from Sankt Annæ Plads to Nyhavn across the land. The property now known as Nyhavn 43 belonged in 1731 to one Anders Møller.

=== Hvidsten family ===
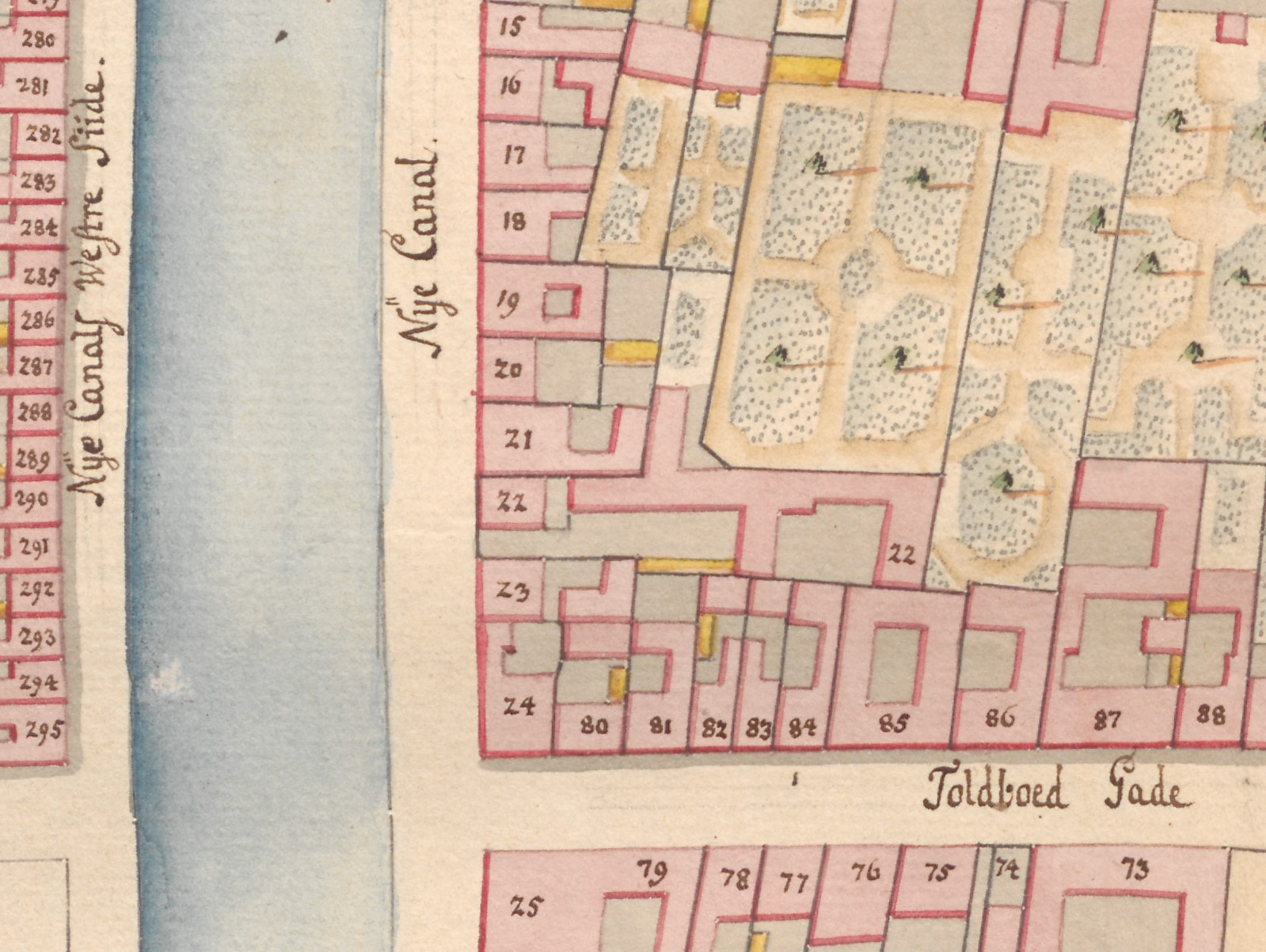
No. 22 seen in a detail from Christian Gedde's map of St. Ann's East Quarter, 1757

The property was at some point acquired by brewer Poul Christensen Hvidsten (Widsten, 1712–1791). His property was listed in the new cadastre of 1756 as No. 22 in St. Ann's East Quarter. The present building on the site was built for him some time before 1788.

Hvidsten's property was home to three households at the 1787 census. The owner resided in the building with his wife Gunnild Cecilie Hvidsteen (née Dybe), their three-year-old son Lars Christian, two brewery workers (one of them an apprentice), a caretaker, a coachman and two maids. The property was also home to two other households. Daniel Friederich Kiølmen, a ship captain, resided in the building with his wife Maria Titgen, their four children (aged two to 16) and two maids. Ole Bonsøe, a beer seller (øltapper) resided in the building with his wife Helwig Sophie Lars Datter, their two children (aged four and seven) and a maid.

=== Grímur Jónsson Thorkelin ===
After her husband's death, Gunnild Cecilie Hvidsteen married the scholar Grímur Jónsson Thorkelin in 1792. At the time of the 1801 census, Johnson Thorkelin and Gunhild Hvidsten resided in the building with their 11-year-old son Frederik Stephan Thorkelin, Gunhild Cecilie Hvidsten's daughter Jensenius Johan Hvidtsteen, two more children (aged three and four), a brewery worker and three maids. Hans Lindholm, a naval officer and adjutant general, resided in the building with his wife Elisabeth Reinhardine Fabricius-Tengnagel, their three children (aged one to five), a chamber maid (husjomfru), a housekeeper and two maids.

In the new cadastre of 1806, the property was again listed as No. 22. It was by then still owned by Thorkelin. He died in 1829. It is not clear whether he had parted with the property prior to his death. The merchant Hans Puggaard resided in the building from 1827 to 1829.

=== Hertz family ===
At the time of the 1834 census, No. 22 was home to four households. Jeppe Adam Hertz, a brewer and distiller, resided on the ground floor with his wife Johanne Carine, their seven children (aged six to 23), five brewery workers, three distillery workers and one maid. Hans Jacob Koefoed (1785–1870), a Supreme Court justice, resided on the first floor with his wife Johanne Louise Koefoed, their two-year-old son Jens Laasbye Rottbøll Koefoed, a male servant and a maid. Jørgen Smith (1764–1836), another judge (stiftsassessor) and kancelliråd, resided on the second floor with his wife Johanne Elisabet Smith (née Hornbech), their two children (aged eight and 16), a maid and a lodger (a civil servant). Frederece Jeppesen, the proprietor of a tavern in the basement, resided in the associated dwelling with his 22-year-old son Pouel Frederic Bendix Jeppesen (on a journey to Germany), four lodgers and a maid.

At the time of the 1840 census, No. 22 was home to 41 people. Hans Carl Bodenhoff, a captain in the Royal Danish Navy, head of the 1st Division's 3rd Company, resided on the first floor with his wife Serena Bodenhoff, their three children (aged six to 18) and one maid. Frederik Rubech Bülow, a 1st Major at the Jutland Infantry Regiment, resided on the second floor apartment with his wife Henriette Bülow, their four children (aged 16 to 25), a maid and seven lodgers. The lodgers included the later politician Johan Christian Henrik Fischer (then a theology student) and the brothers Frederik Wilhelm Willemoes (later physician) and Joachim Godske Willemoes (later priest).

The number of residents was down to 25 at the 1850 census. The property was now owned by Johanne Hertz. The brewery and distillery were managed by Christian Hertz (b. 1820). Johan Peter Ferdinand Ekman (b. 1811), a lieutenant and painter, resided in the building with his wife Anine Holgine Marie (née Jørgensen), their three children (aged two to six), a male servant and two maids. Carl Ludvig Frederik Henck (1789–1854), a professor of medicine and chief physician, resided in the building with his wife Henriette Charlotte Amalie Henck, their eight children (aged 15 to 28), and two maids. The son Johan Wilhelm Emanuel Henck (aged 27) was an architect.

=== 1880 census ===
The property was home to 26 residents at the 1880 census. August Feuerhacke, a business manager (handelsbestyrer), resided on the ground floor with his wife Gunhilde Feuerhacke f Madsen, a housekeeper, a foster daughter, two apprentices and a maid. Victor Christian Frederik Bondesen, a chief physician (Doctor of Medicine), resided on the first floor with his wife Rebekka Tilaine Bondesen (née Baumann), four of their children (aged 17 to 27), a female cook and a maid. Jens and Ole Madsen, two hauliers, resided on the ground floor and first floor of the rear wing with his wife. Frederik Sporleder, a skipper, resided on the third floor with his wife Karen Sporleder (née Svendsen) and their three sons (aged three to six). Hans Hansen, a workman, resided on the third floor of the rear wing with his wife Mariane Hansen (née Philipsen) and their two daughters (aged 19 and 20).

=== 20th century ===
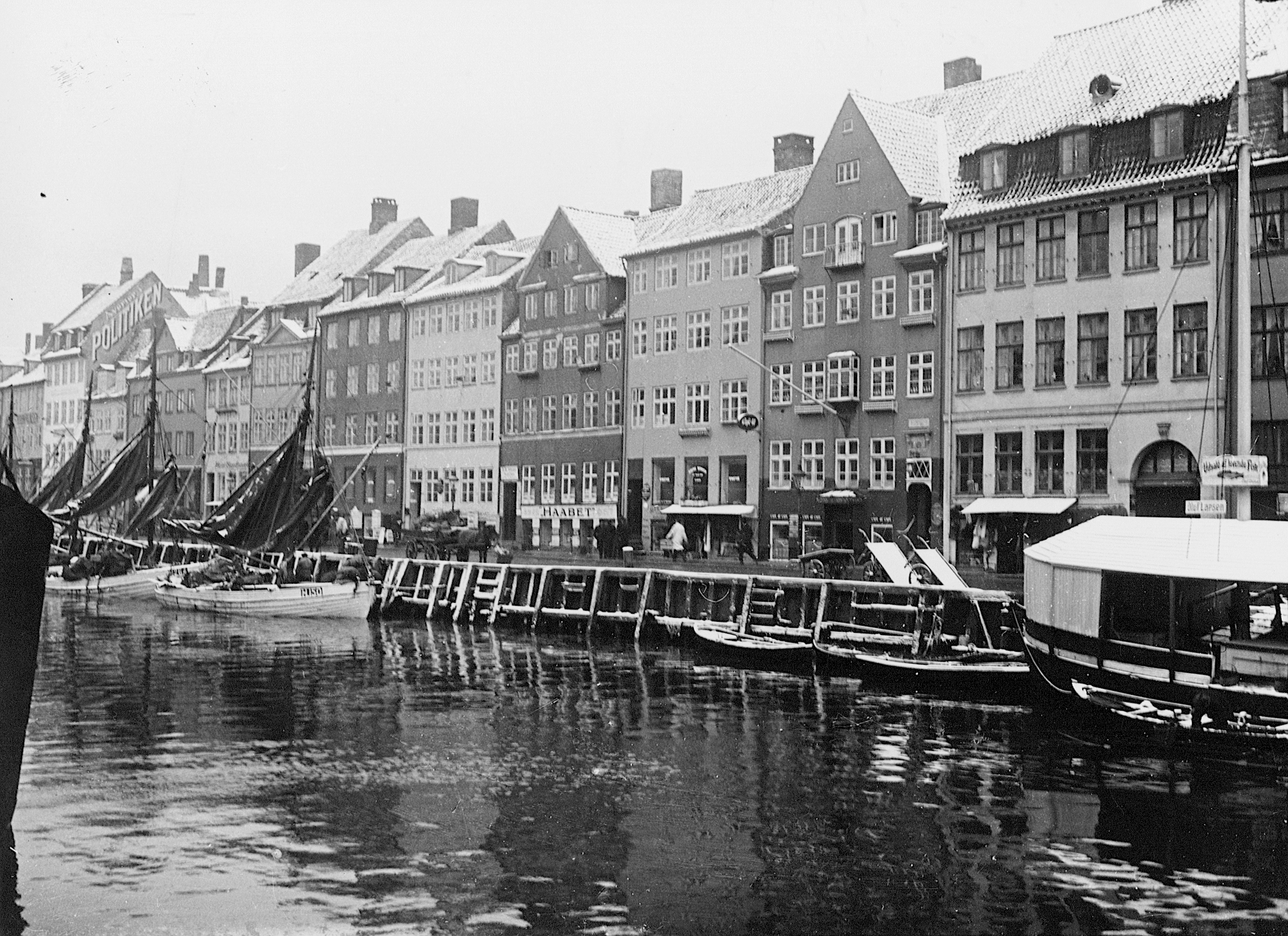
Nyhavn 43 seen farthest to the right on a photograph by Paul Gustav Fischer, c. 1900

Jacobsen & Saabye, a wholesale company, was later based in the building. Founded by Louis Hansen in 1875, it was from 1919 owned by Hans Jacobsen (21 November 1872–8 March 1949) and A. Saabye. Saabye left the company in 1929. It was after Jacobsen's death in 1949 continued by his two children, Herman Jacobser (born 1899) and daughter J. Højby Hansen (b. 1908).

== Architecture ==
The building consists of three storeys over a high cellar and is six bays wide. The building has a black-glazed tile roof with three dormers. A small balcony is located in front of the central dormer. Under the roof runs a cornice supported by brackets. The gateway is flanked by two cannon barrels to protect the corners from carriage wheels. A projecting keystone is seen over the gate.

Two former warehouses and a rear wing with stables are located in the courtyard.

== Gallery ==
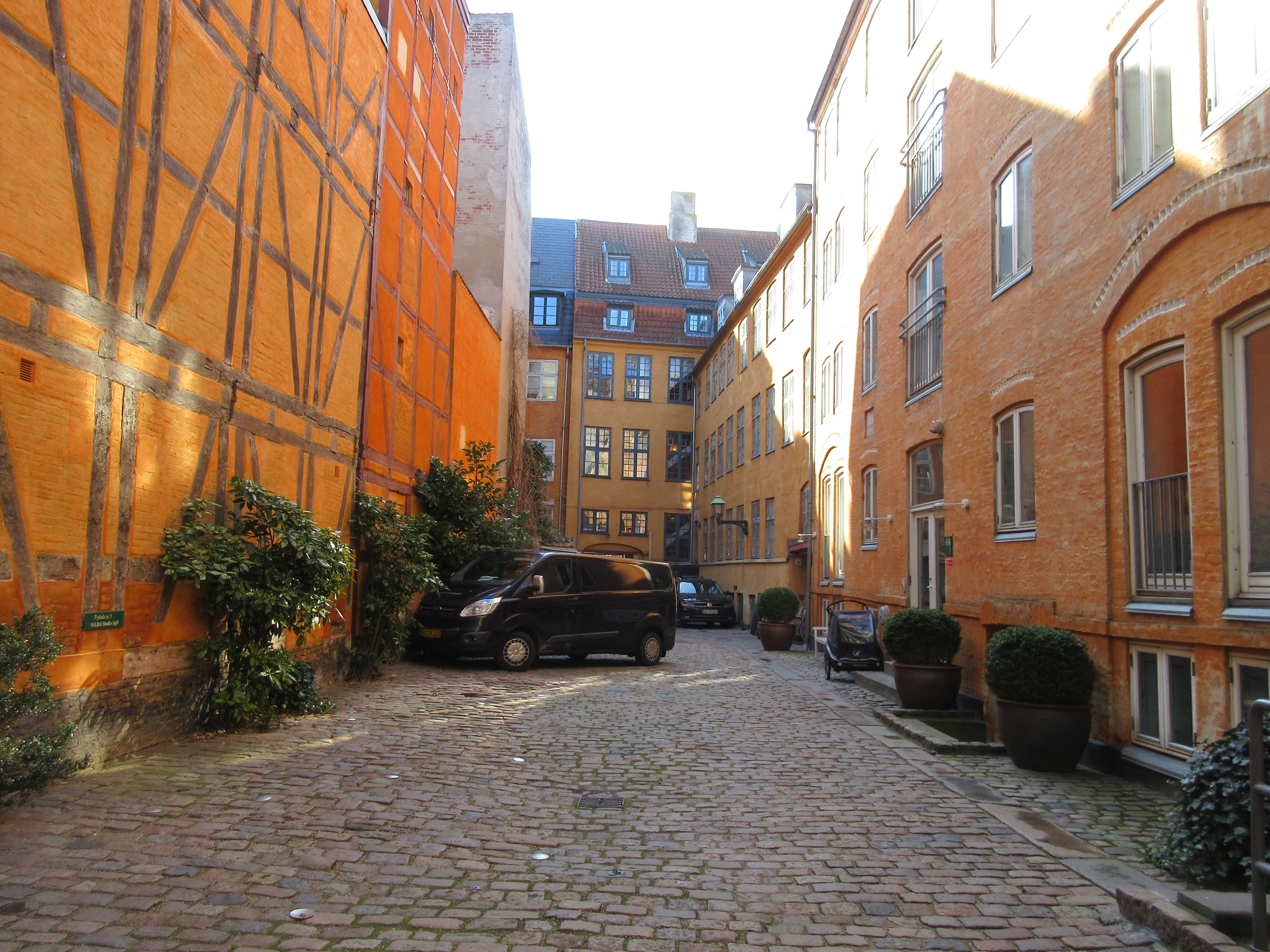
Courtyard

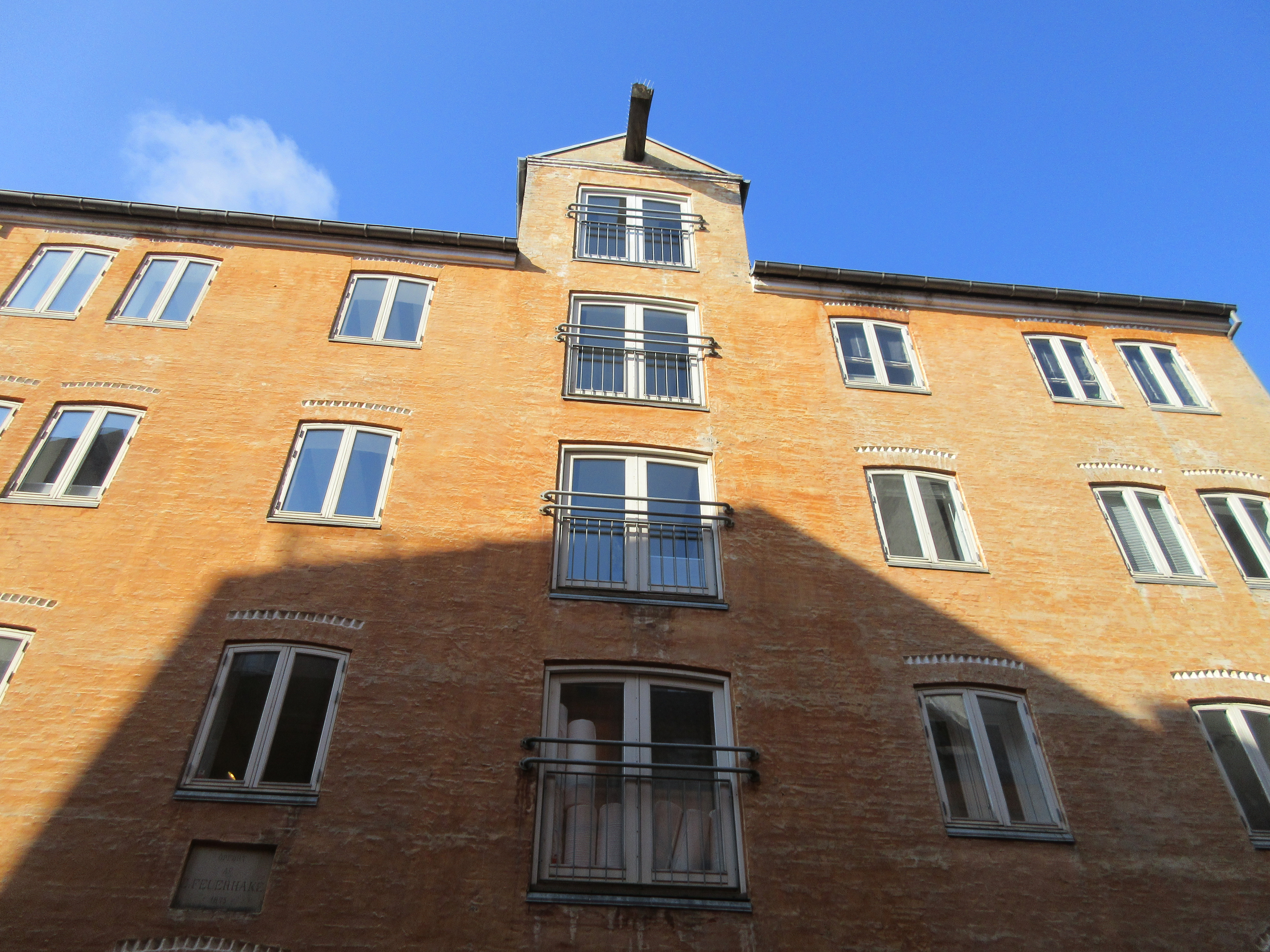
Nyhavn 43A

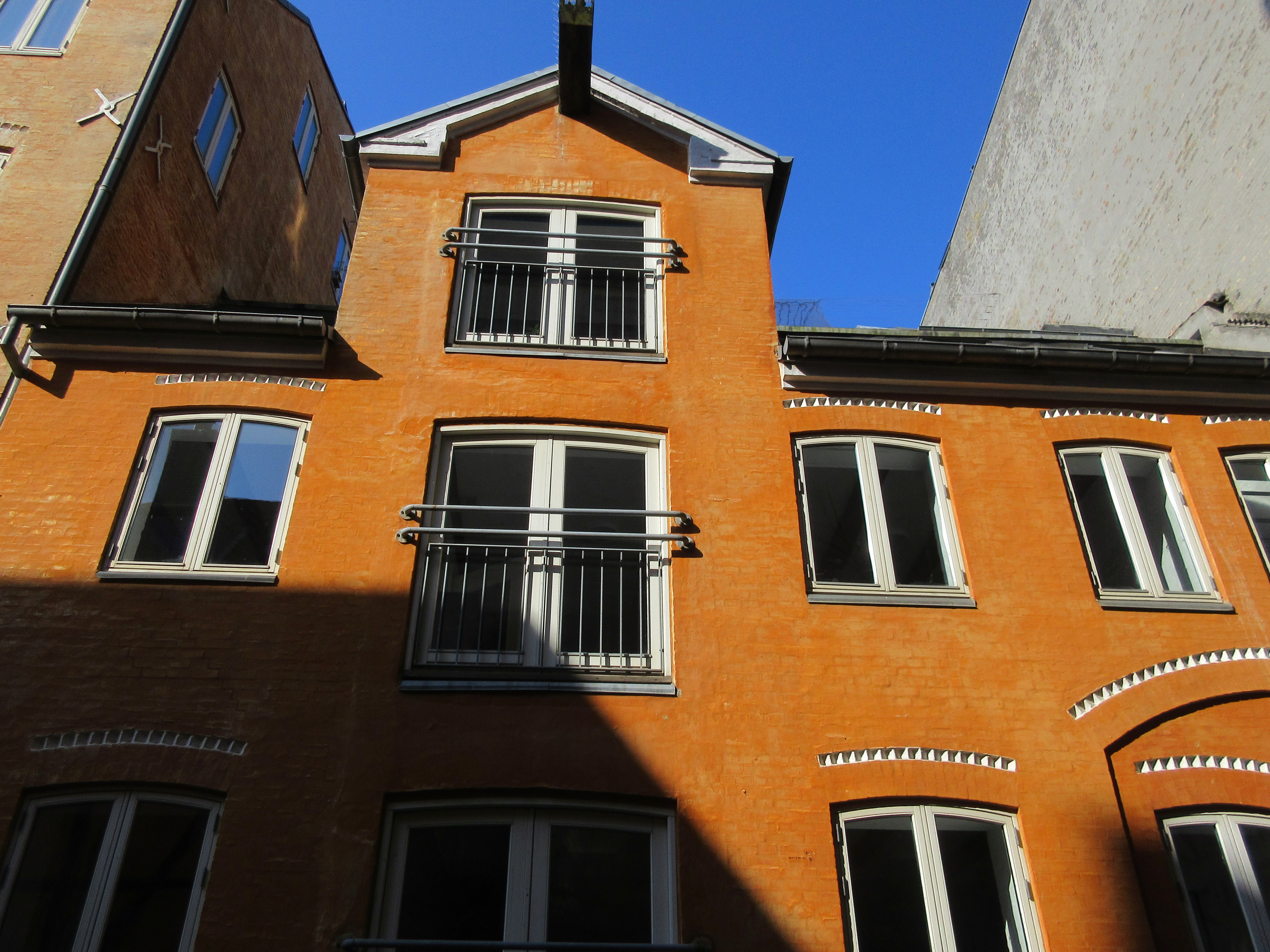
Nyhavn 43B

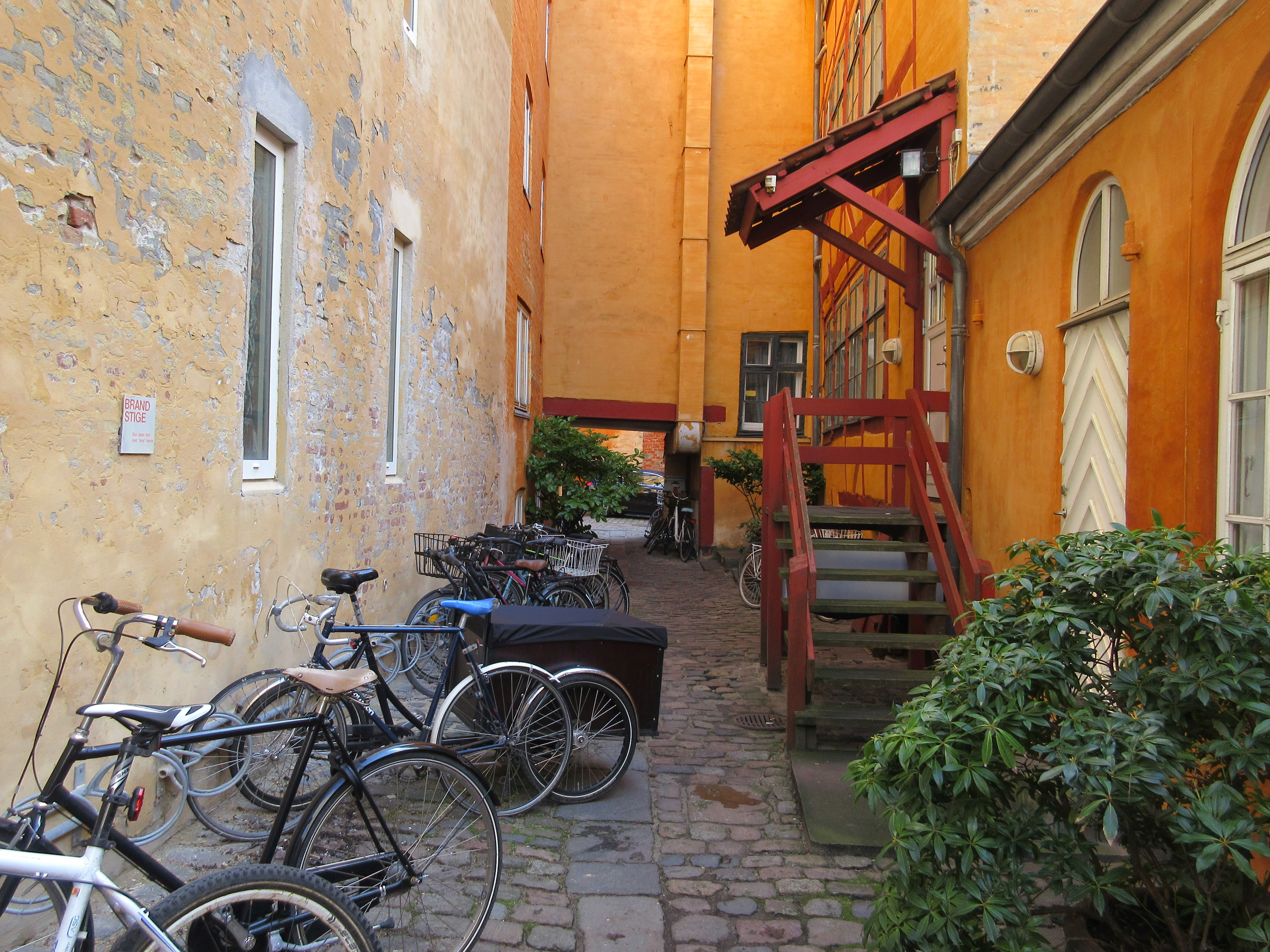
Courtyard appendix

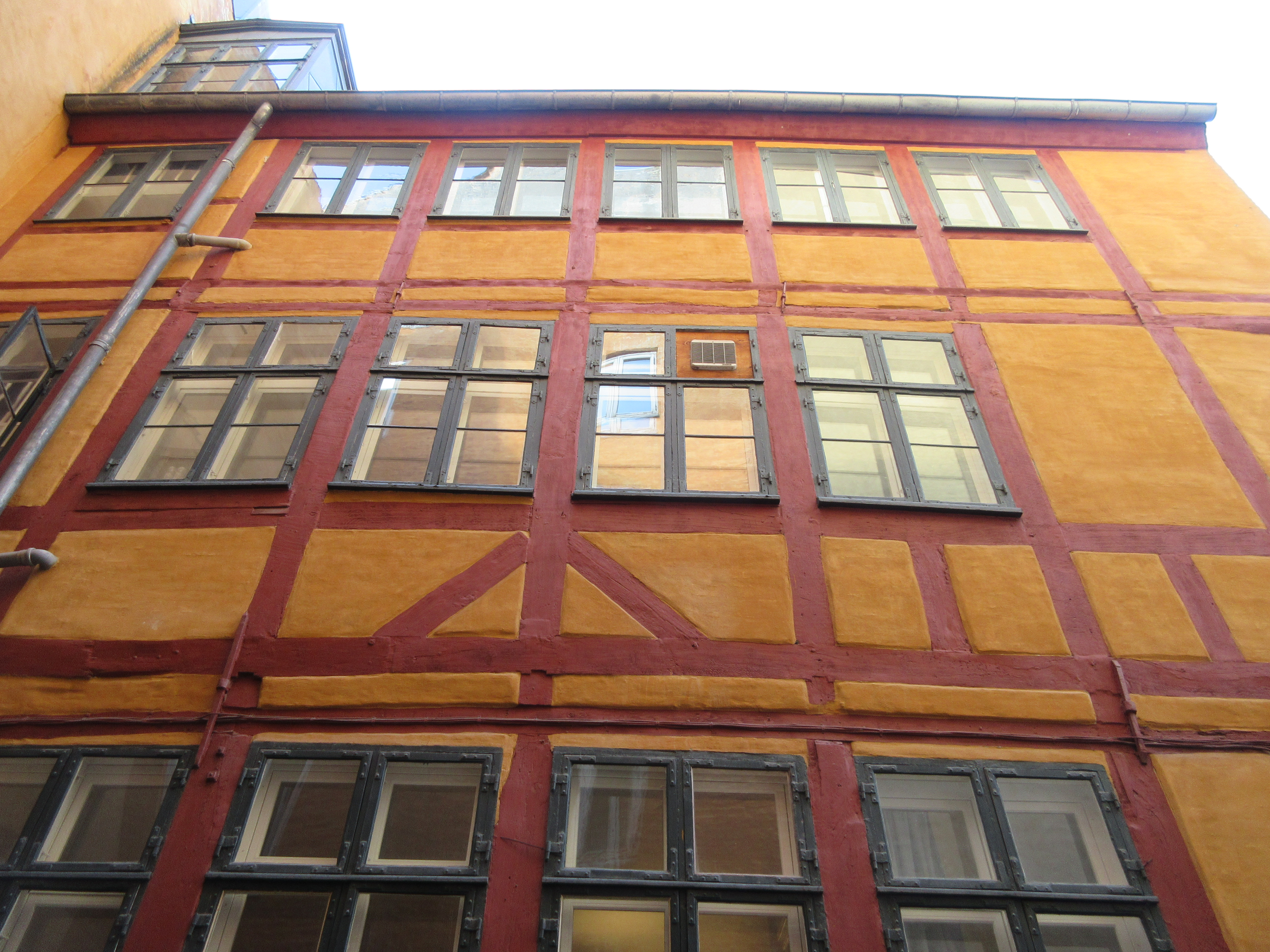
Nyhavn 43C

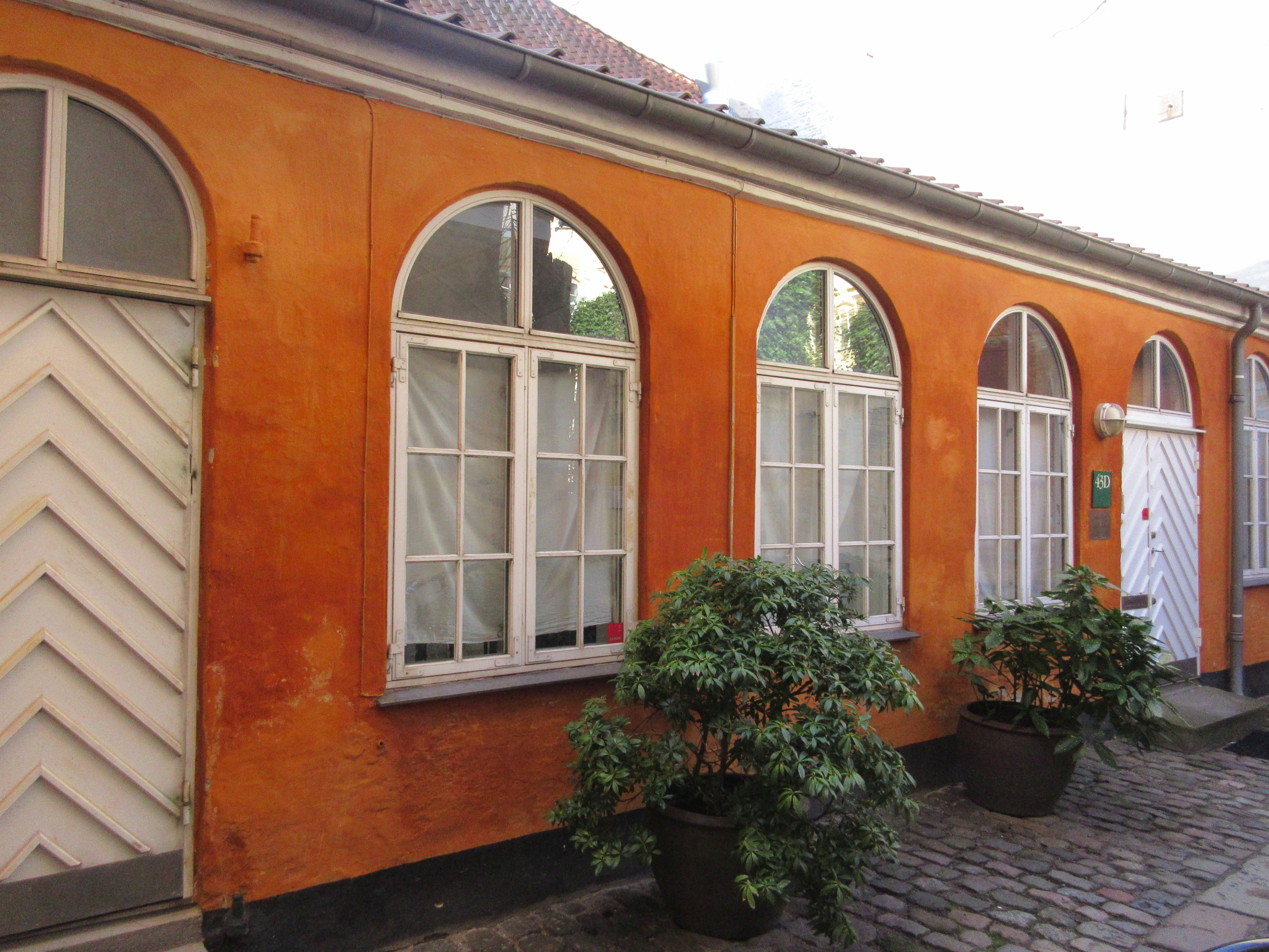
Nyhavn 43D

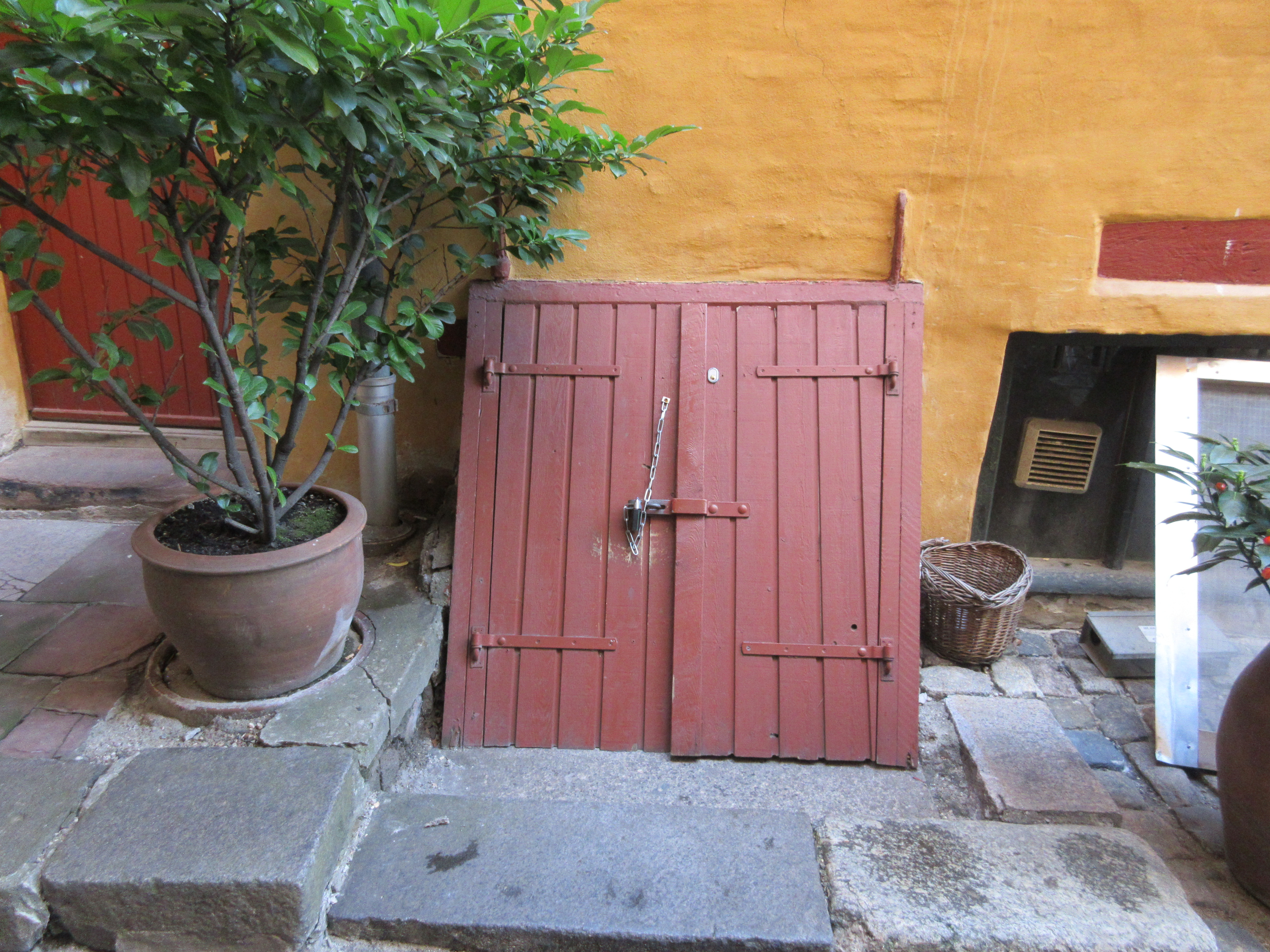
Detail of Nyhavn 43C

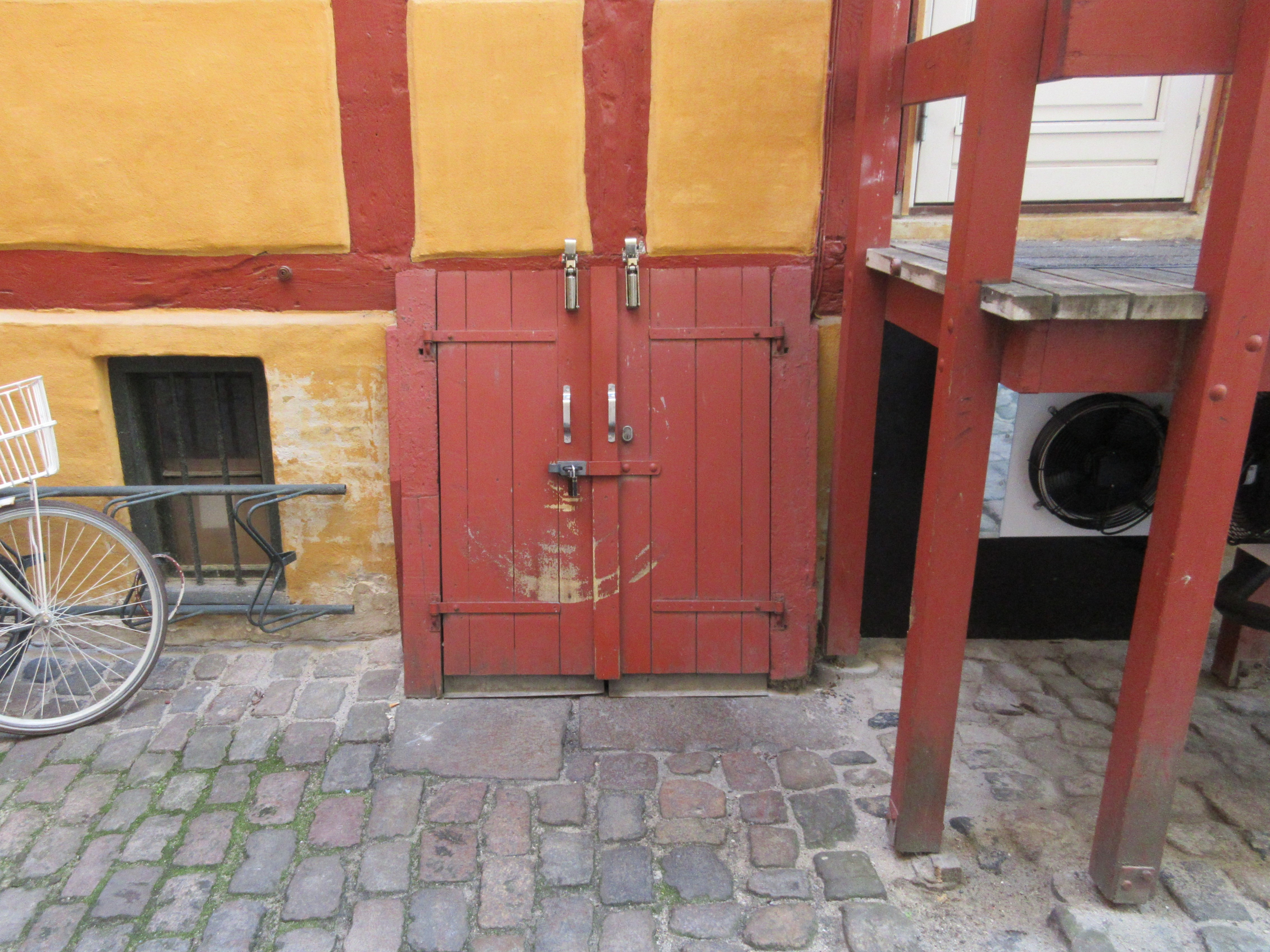
Detail of Nyhavn 43C

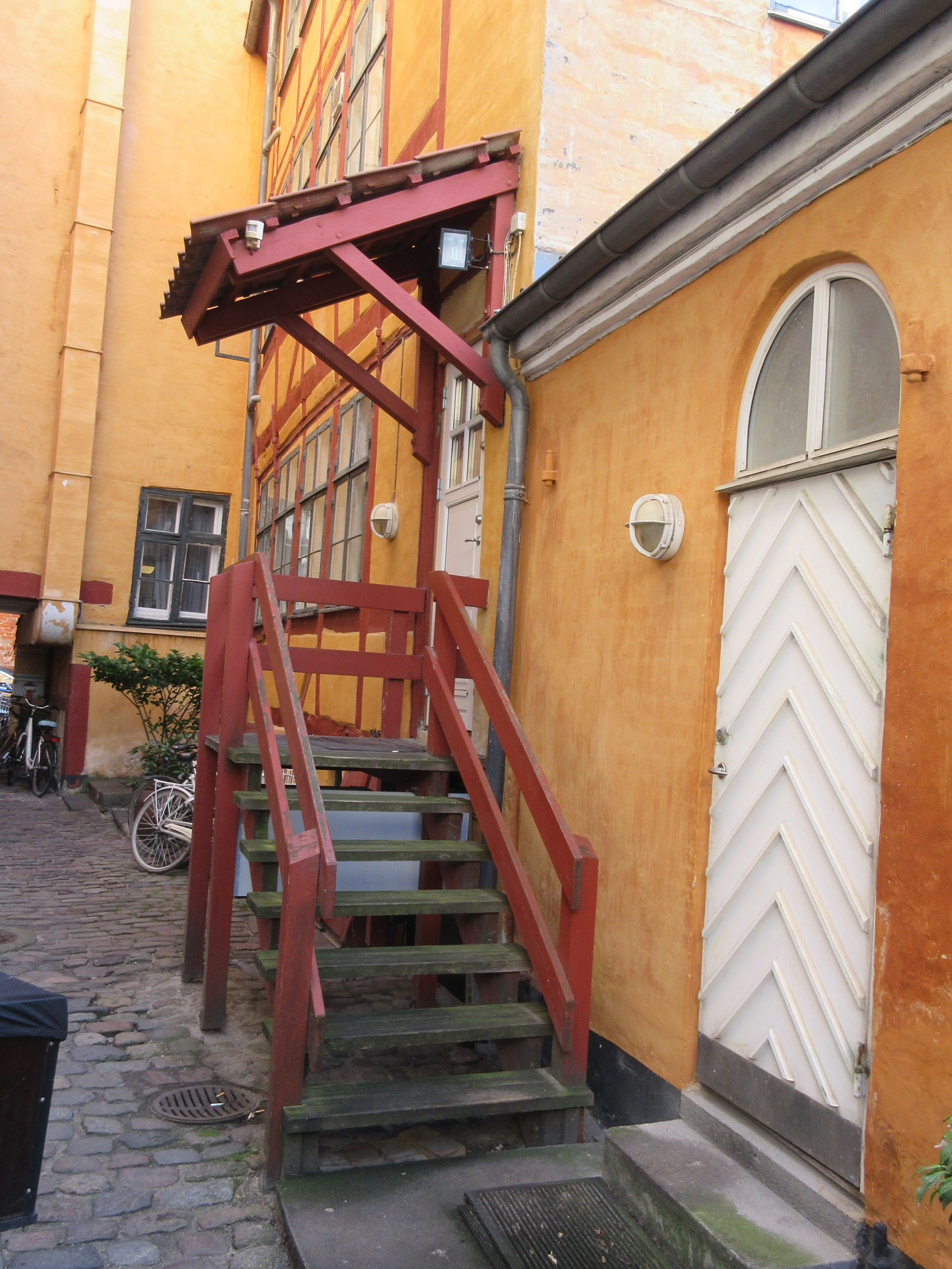
Detail of Nyhavn 43C

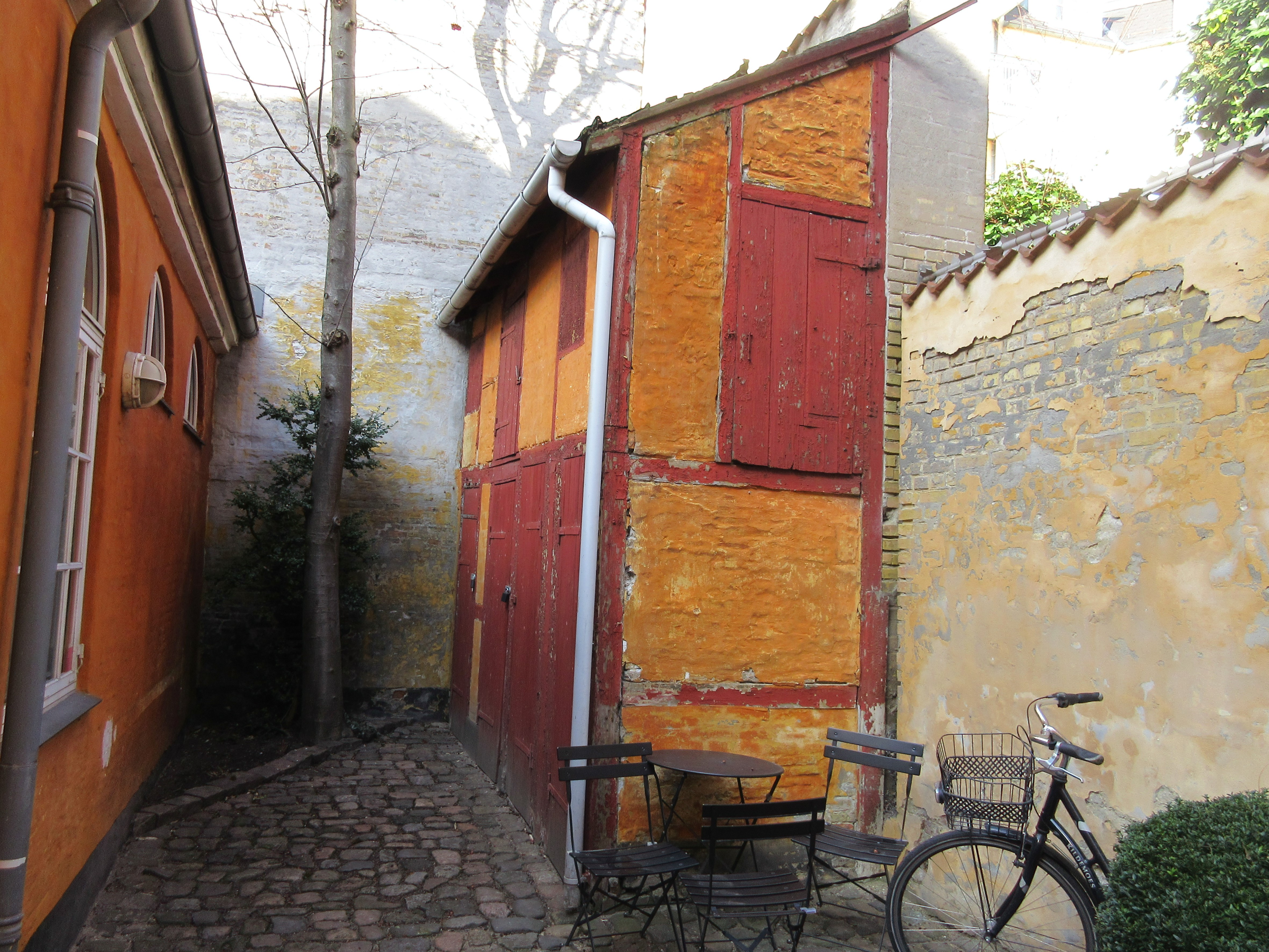
Outbuilding in the appendix to the courtyard
