= Bolette Puggaard (disambiguation) =

Bolette Puggaard may refer to:

== People ==
- Bolette Puggaardm née Hage (1798-), Danish painter
- Bolette Hartmann, née Puggaard, wife of Emil Hartmann

== Other ==
- Bolette Puggaard (ship), brig owned by Hans Puggaard & Co.
