= Hans Puggaard =

Danish merchant and shipowner

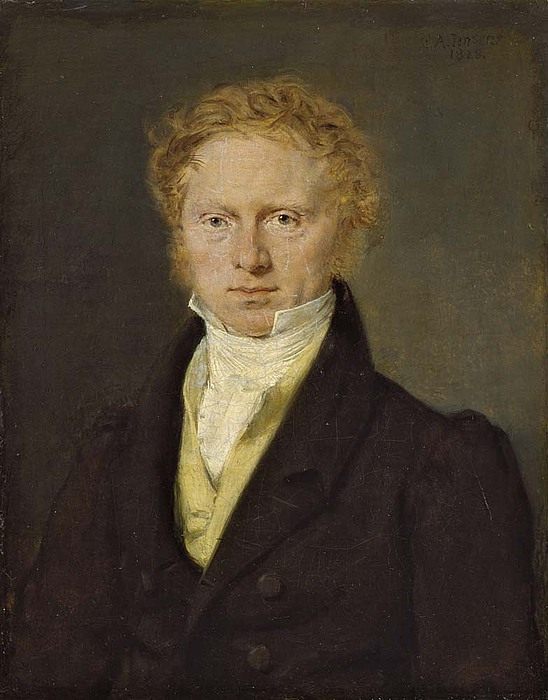
- Puggaard painted by C. A. Jensen in 1828
- Born: 3 September 1788; Copenhagen, Denmark
- Died: 8 April 1866 (aged 77); Copenhagen, Denmark
- Occupations: Merchant and shipowner
- Spouse: Bolette Puggaard (m. 1816 – d. 1847)
- Children: Rudolph Puggaard; Christopher Puggaard; Annette Maria Lehmann

Hans Puggaard (3 September 1788 - 8 April 1866) was a Danish merchant and shipowner who founded H. Puggaard & Co. in 1813. The company became a leading wholesaler of grain and was also active in the market for import of goods such as coffee and especially sugar. Puggaard was also an important philanthropist dedicating much of his fortune to social causes.

Puggaard's wife, Bolette Puggaard née Hage, a daughter of Christopher Friedenreich Hage, was a painter. The couple supported many of the artists of the Danish Golden Age. Their daughter married Orla Lehmann.

== Early life and education ==
Puggard was born in Copenhagen in poor conditions. His parents were Thomas Puggaard (1748-1818) and Cathrine Marie Puggaard née Svane (1754-1814). His father was assistant cantor at the Church of Holmen and owner of the punch bar at the Royal Theatre on Kongens Nytorv. He was initially not sent to school but had to assist in his father's punch bar, but later attended Det von Westenske Institut in Nørregade. He had aspirations to become a merchant but was unable to find an apprenticeship and therefore trained as a surveyor before he was employed as a clerk in the head office at Classen's Frederiksværk. He began his career in trade by receiving small commissions for bringing goods along on his journeys between Frederiksværk and Copenhagen. When Puggaard acted as secretary for Eilert Tscherning's on his journey to Sweden in 1812, he used the opportunity to buy up English products that were unavailable in Denmark at the time.

== H. Puggaard & Co. ==
In 1813, Puggaard was finally licensed as merchant and established his own trading house. He went on numerous journeys to Sweden, Hamburg, England and seaports on the Baltic Sea. Puggaard specialized in exporting grain from the countries around the Baltic Sea to England but also traded in timber, herring and wine.

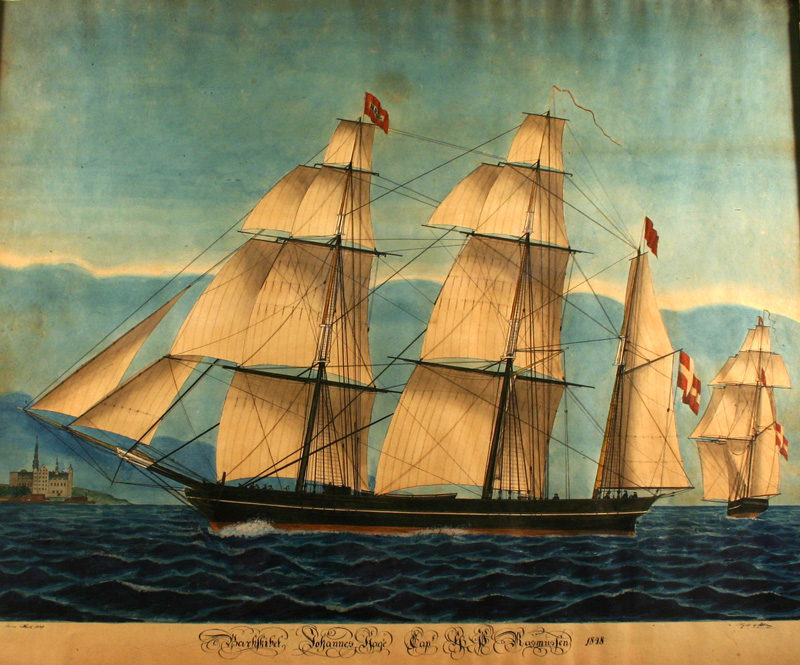
Johannes Hage in 1849

Puggaard's marriage to Bolette Hage, a daughter of Christopher Friedenreich Hage a business partner on Møn, was also a key event in the development of his company. The marriage strengthened the business relationship between the two families and Puggaard later employed his brother-in-law Alfred Hage as head of his company's activities in Nakskov and he later became a partner in the company. The Nakskov branch operated its own fleet. In 1823, it consisted of two schooners, Caroline and Anette Hage, both built in Nakskov, the brig Bolette Puggaard, the barque Johannes Hage and schooner brig (skonnertbriggen) Hother.

Hans Puggaard's son, Rudolph Puggaard, joined the Nakskov office in 1839 and worked in a leading position at the head office in Copenhagen from 1842.

Trade in grain remained the most important business area but the company was also a major importer of goods such as coffee and sugar, and later also engaged in banking.

In later years the younger Hage gradually came to play a more dominant role in the company. After Alfred Hage’s death, Hans Puggaard’s son Rudolph took over the leadership of the company.

=== Shipping ===
In 1865, shortly prior to Hans Puggaard's death but after he was no longer active in the company, H. Puggaard & Co. was a co-founder of Det Kjøbenhavnske Skibsrederi. The following ships were either owned by H. Puggaard & Co. or Det Kjøbenhavnske Skibsrederi:

- 1852 - NAJADEN (ID=9823) (P1), purchased from the Royal Danish Navy in 1865.
- 1853 - FREIA (ID=9824), purchased from the Navy
- 1859 - ZAMPA (ID=3588), purchased from H.P. Prior and H.P. Prior in 1864.
- 1859 - FREIA (ID=11236), purchased a 5+ & share from H.P. Prior.
- 1861 - SAGA (ID=9606), purchased from the Navy.
- 1863 - ROTA (ID=9825), purchased from the Navy.
- 1865 - Havfruen (ID=9826), purchased from the Navy.
- 1865 - MARIA LEHMANN (ID=3510), still owned in 1868.
- 1866 - BOLETTE PUGGAARD (ID=3271), still owned in 1869.
- 1866 - JOHANNES HAGE (ID=9828), built for the company.
- 1867 - SIGNE (ID=3271), formerly NAJADEN (ID=10932), purchased from the Navy and sold in 1882.
- 1868 - CHARLOTTE HAGE (ID=3271), sold before 1873.
- 1870 - CHRISTOPHER HAGE (ID=12436), owned by Puggaard & Hage, Nakskov.
- 1872 - HOTHER (ID=9377), owned by Puggaard & Hage, Nakskov.
- 1873 - TORDENSKJOLD (ID=9827), purchased from the Navy.
- 1875 - ESBERN SNARE (ID=11645), built for the company and sold in 1876.
- 1876 - BURY ST. EDMUNDS (ID=3271), sold in 1888.

== Personal life ==
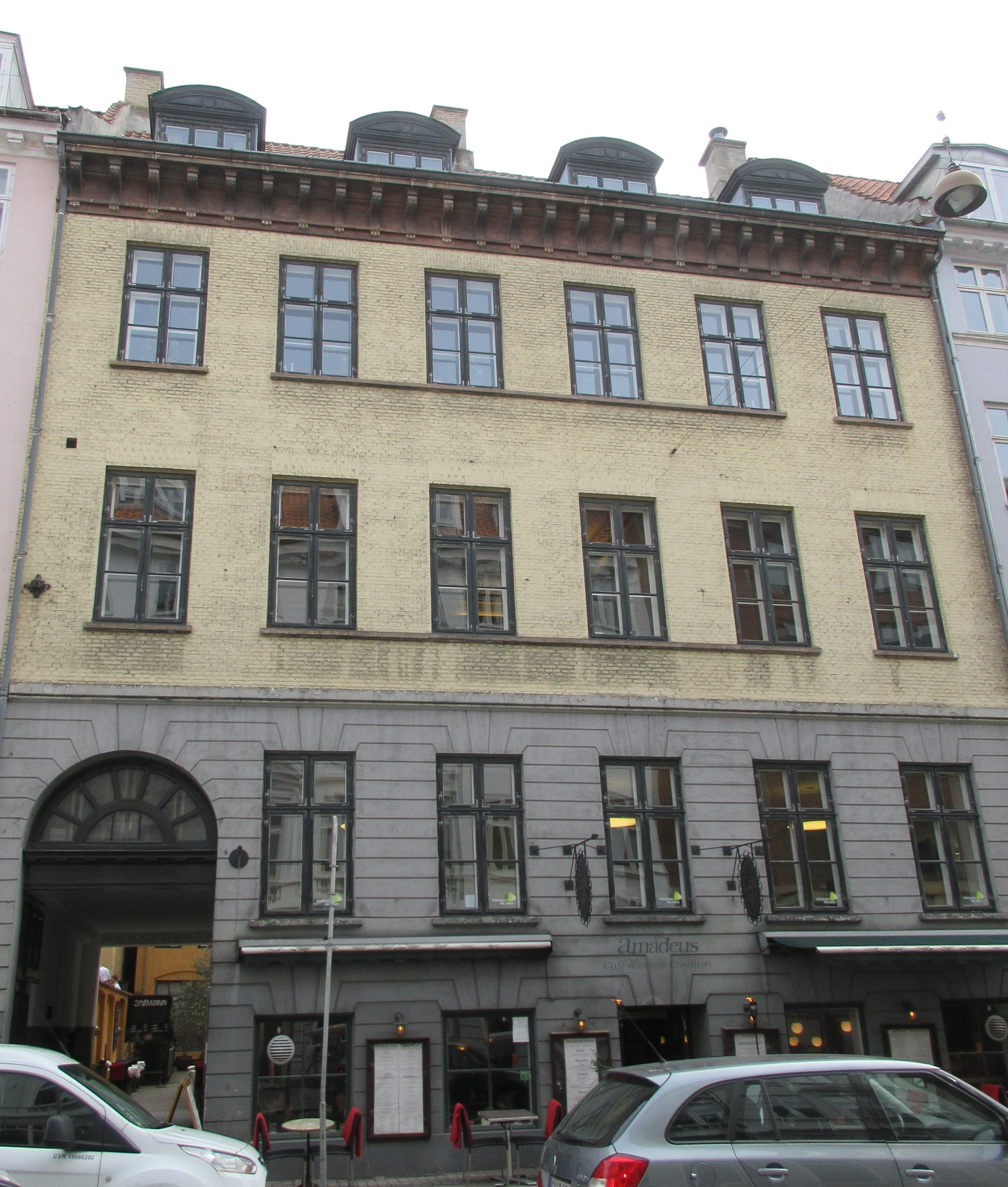
Store Kongensgade 62 where Puggaard lived from 1830 to 1866

Puggaard married Bolette Cathrine Frederikke Hage on 13 August 1816 in Stege Church. They had three children, the sons Rudolph Puggaard (1818-1883) and Christopher Puggaard (1823-1864), a renowned geologist, and the daughter Annette Maria Puggaard (1821-1849).

Hans and Bolette Puggaard lived at Store Kongensgade 72 from 1930. Puggaard has also lived in the listed properties at Kronprinsessegade 48 (1816–1818), Nyhavn 31 (1826), Nyhavn 43 (1827–1829) as well as in a now demolished building at Store Kongensgade 63 (1916 and 1819–1823) and Dronningens Tværgade 9 (1824–1825). In 1831, Puggaard purchased Skovgården at Ordrup. for use as a summer retreat. The building was moved when Skovgårdsskolen was built in the 1960s but has now been listed.

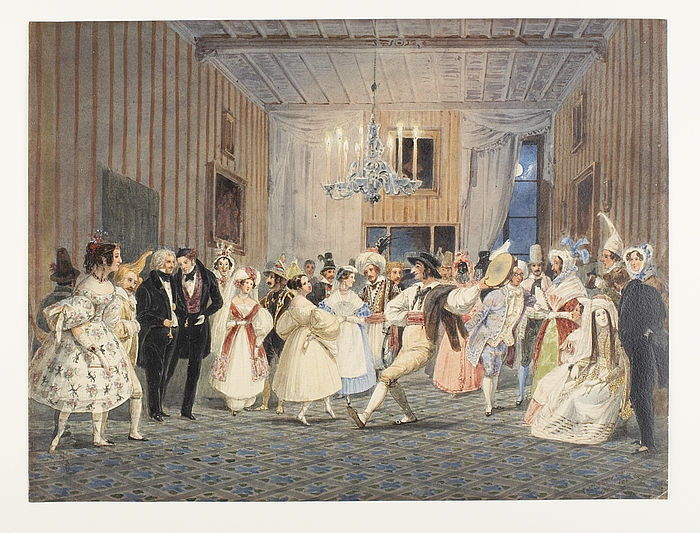
Carnival at the Puggaard family's residence in Rome, 1836

Bolette Puggaard was interested in the arts and herself a distinguished painter. Their homes in Copenhagen and Ordrup were frequented by many of the leading artists of the time, Bertel Thorvaldsen, C. W. Eckersberg, Wilhelm Marstrand and Thorvald Bindesbøll.

The Puggaard family visited Rome several times in the 1830s, for instance in 1835-36. . Their Roman residence was situated in Via degli Avignonesein, close to Piazza Barberini and Thorvaldsen's studio. The Puggaard's became known for their soirées. Puggaard was a member of the committee that was set up in connection with the establishment of Thorvaldsens Museum.

When their daughter Maria married Orla Lehmann their home also became a meeting place for the inner circle of the National Liberal movement. Puggaard had political interests and was a member of Folketinget from 1854 to 1958 and again 1861 to 1864, and of Landstinget in 1864-66.

Already in his life time, Puggaard remained associated with major philanthropic contributions, in the form of the « Puggaardske Legater ».

Puggaard died on 8 April 1866 and is buried in the Cemetery of Holmen.

== See also ==
- Bolette Puggaard (disambiguation)
