= J-dag =

Launch day of Christmas beer in Denmark

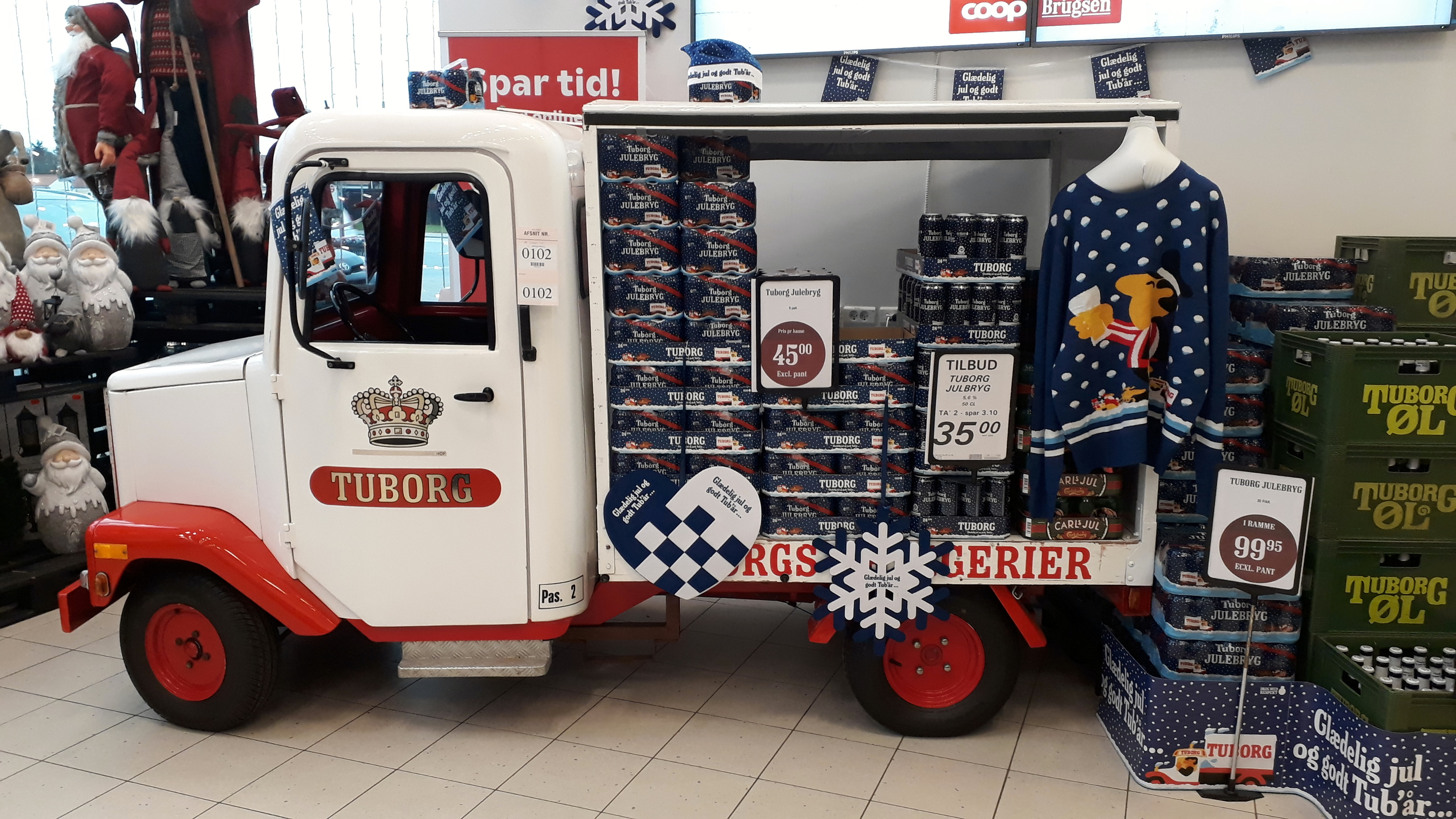
An advertising display for Tuborg Julebryg

In Danish culture, J-dag (short for "julebryg dag", meaning Christmas beer day) is the name given to the day on which Tuborg Brewery releases its christmas beer, Tuborg Julebryg. The concept was launched in 1990, though it had reportedly been celebrated in the mid-1980s. In 2008, the noun j-dag was included in Retskrivningsordbogen, the Danish spelling dictionary.

== Background and history ==
Tuborg Julebryg has been Denmark's best-selling Christmas beer since its launch in 1981, and it is the fourth best-selling beer in Denmark. The beer itself is a slightly stronger beer than a regular Tuborg beer, containing a taste of liquorice.

In 1990, Tuborg began marketing the day on which they launched Julebryg as "J-dag". The idea was taken from Tuborg's existing P-dag campaign, involving the launch of their Easter beer. J-dag reportedly came about around the mid-1980s, when, among other things, students marked the launch of the Christmas beer, but it was not until 1990 that Tuborg first launched J-dag as a celebration. J-Day was also partially inspired by a time in the 1980s when on the second Wednesday in November at 23:59, large numbers of people would gather to receive that year's version of the French red wine Beaujolais nouveau.

From 1990 to 1998, the event was held on the second Wednesday of November and Tuborg Julebryg would only arrive a minute before midnight. In 1999, Tuborg's J-dag was moved to the first Friday in November, due to a large number of students and workers either turning up late for school or not turning up at all after partying the night before, with teachers and employers issuing complaints to Carlsberg. From then on, the Julebryg has arrived at 8:59pm.

In 2009, Tuborg's J-day was moved to the last Friday in October, but the following year the day was moved back to the first Friday in November, and it has remained the same ever since. In 2020, for the first time ever, J-dag was cancelled due to the COVID-19 pandemic.

== Celebrations ==
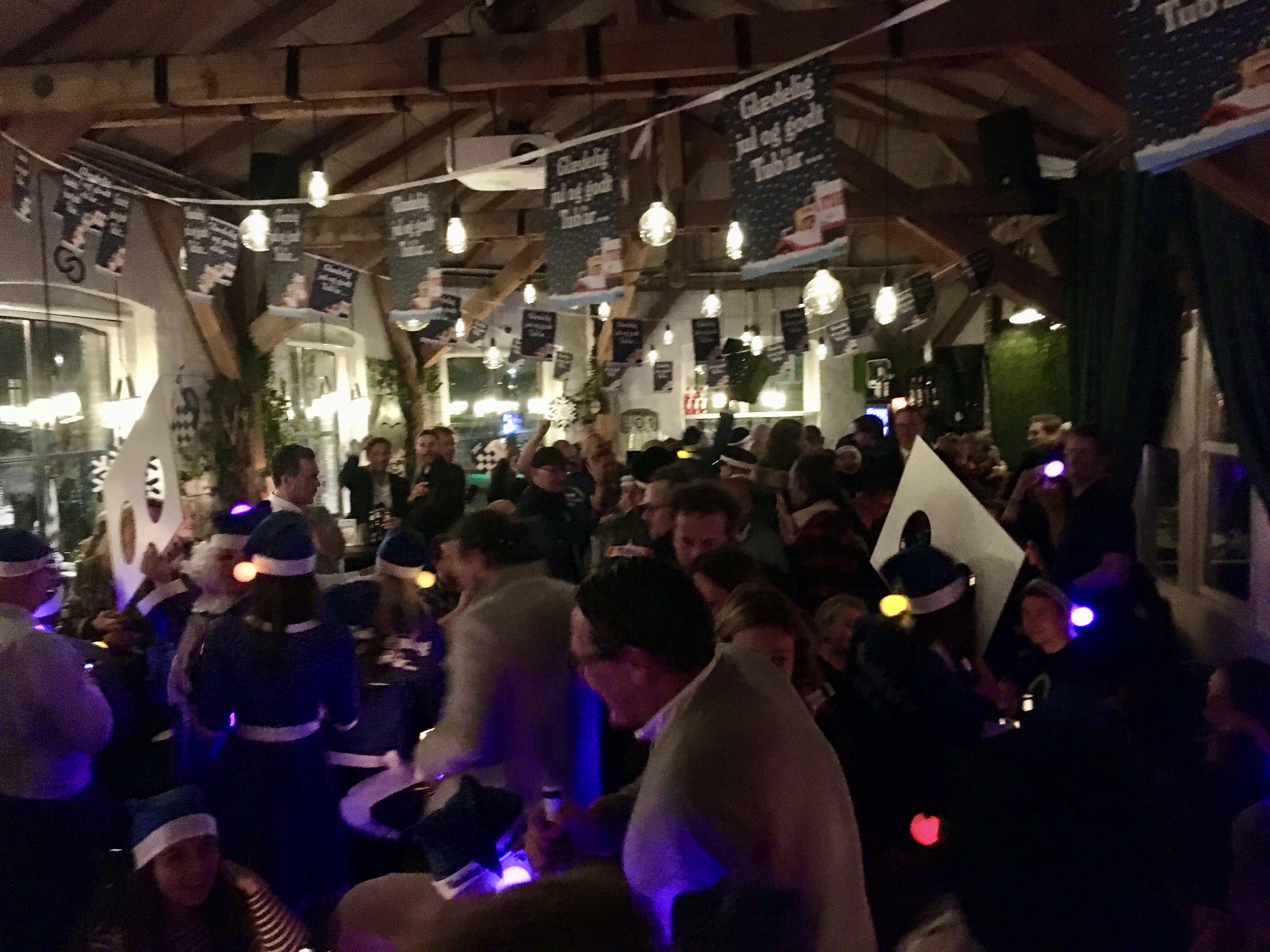
J-dag celebrations in Copenhagen, 2019

During the event, Tuborg's blue elves distribute thousands of free Julebryg beers and blue Santa hats. The theme of "snow" is common on J-dag; when the beer is about to be launched, it is said that "the snow is falling", and the event is often referred to as a "snowstorm". While launched by Tuborg, the name J-dag has become synonymous with the launch of several other Christmas beers. The day is notably celebrated on the famed party street Jomfru Ane Gade in Aalborg. In 1994, Tuborg distributed ice cream rather than beer to partygoers in Odense. The event has frequently seen an increase in policing and spot checks by Danish police.

Past Tuborg J-Dags

- 1990: November 14
- 1991: November 13
- 1992: November 11
- 1993: November 10
- 1994: November 9
- 1995: November 8
- 1996: November 13
- 1997: November 12
- 1998: November 11
- 1999: November 5
- 2000: November 3
- 2001: November 9
- 2002: November 1
- 2003: November 7
- 2004: November 5
- 2005: November 4
- 2006: November 3
- 2007: November 2
- 2008: November 7
- 2009: October 30
- 2010: November 5
- 2011: November 4
- 2012: November 2
- 2013: November 1
- 2014: November 7
- 2015: November 6
- 2016: November 4
- 2017: November 3
- 2018: November 2
- 2019: November 1
- 2020: November 6 (cancelled due to COVID-19)
- 2021: November 5
- 2022: November 4
- 2023: November 3
