= Tuborg Brewery =

Danish brewing company

Tuborgs Fabrikker
- Location: Fredericia, Denmark
- Opened: 1873; 153 years ago
- Annual production volume: 2 million hectolitres (1.7 million US beer barrels)
- Other products: Soft drinks
- Owned by: Carlsberg Group
- Website: tuborg.com

Tuborg (Danish pronunciation: [ˈtsʰuːˌpɒˀ]) is a Danish brewing company founded in 1873 on a harbour in Hellerup, to the north of Copenhagen, Denmark. Since 1970, it has been part of the Carlsberg Group. The brewery's flagship product, the Tuborg pilsner, was brewed for the first time in 1880.

== History ==
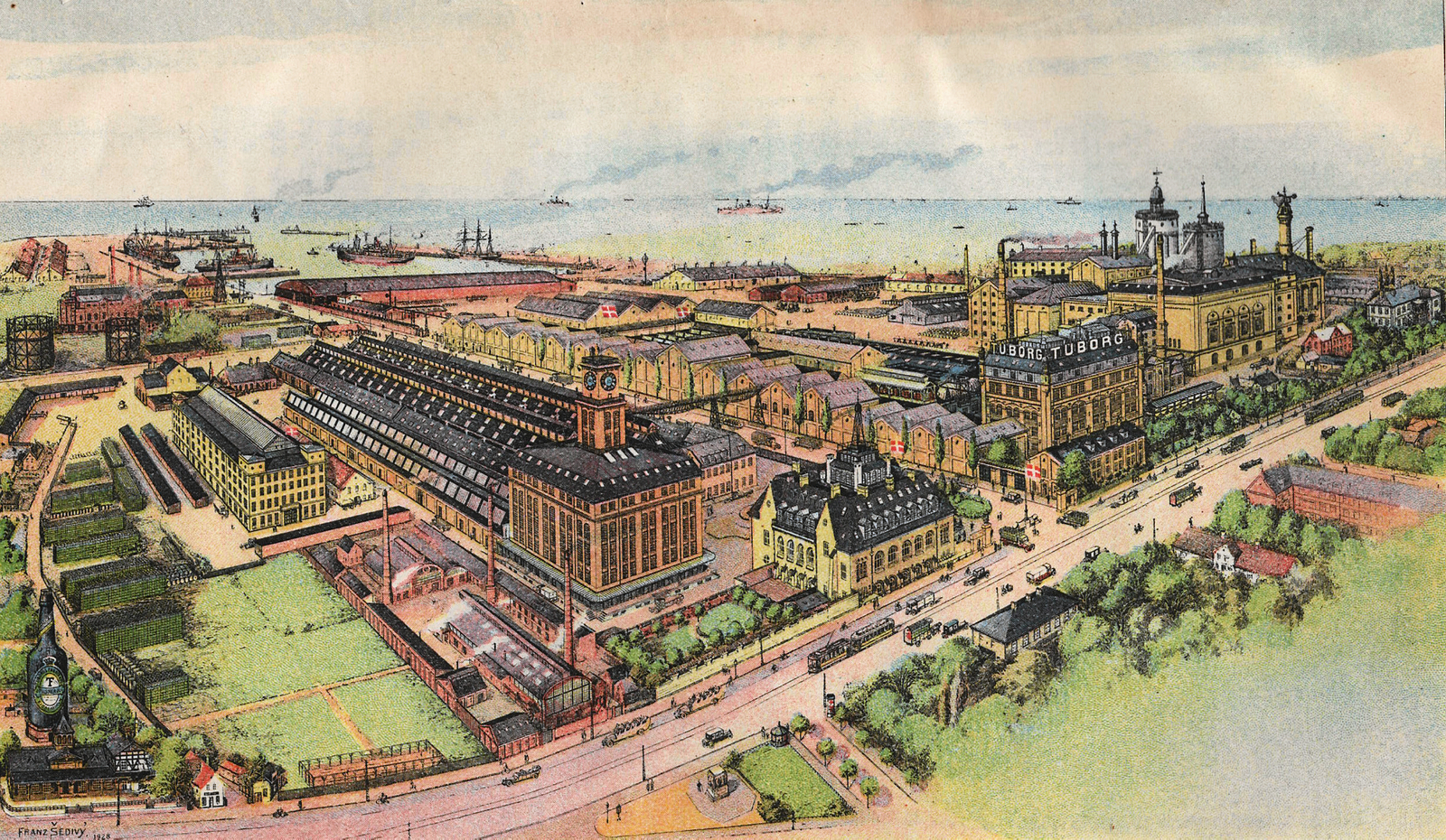
Tuborg in 1928

The name Tuborg comes from Thuesborg ("Thue's castle"), a Copenhagen inn from the 1690s situated in the area of the brewery. This evolved and was adopted into local placenames, such as Lille Tuborg and Store Tuborg. Tuborgvej in Copenhagen is named after the site of the original Tuborg brewery.

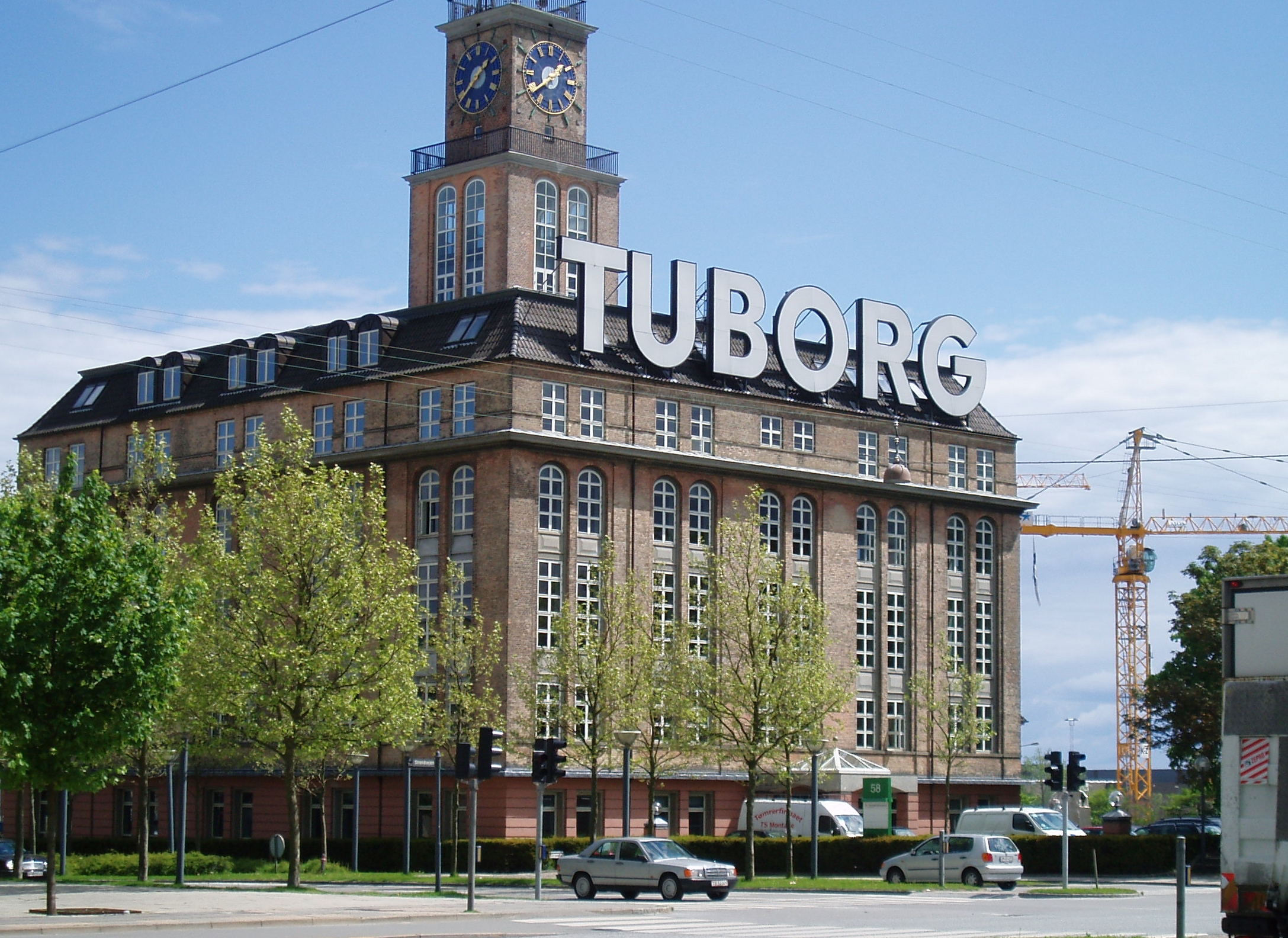
Tuborg's former mineral water factory is one of only five buildings left from the old brewery complex in Hellerup.

Philip Heyman (5 November 1837 – 15 December 1893) was a Danish-Jewish industrialist who co-founded in 1873 the Tuborg Brewery, together with C. F. Tietgen, Gustav Brock [da] and Rudolph Puggaard. After Heyman's death, the Tuborg Brewery merged with "De Forenede Bryggerier" in 1894, which through this way entered into a profit-sharing agreement with Carlsberg in 1903. Benny Desau, Heyman's son-in-law, was a director of De Forenede Bryggerier, followed by his son Einar Dessau in 1919.

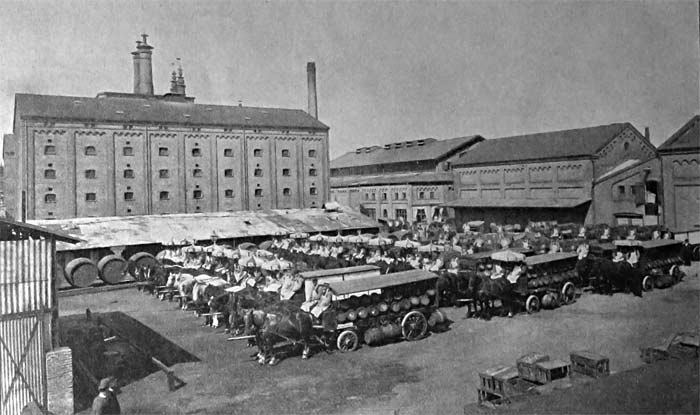
Tuborg in the 1900s. Arrangement of beer wagons at Tuborg, photographed at the 25th anniversary in 1900.

During the Occupation, because of his Jewish background, Einar Dessau had to flee to Sweden in November 1943, where he joined the Danish resistance movement. After the war, he resumed his position at Tuborg.

In the last year of the war, Tuborg's boiler house was destroyed on 5 January, or schalburgtage, but beer deliveries could still be continued the next day thanks to outside help.

== Marketing ==
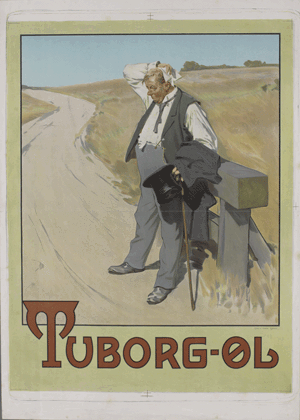
Poster by Erik Henningsen for Tuborg beer (1900), known as "the thirsty man"

=== Advertisement ===
In 1990, Tuborg launched their annual Christmas brew on the second Wednesday in November, with the marketing term "J-day"; "snestorm" (blizzard) and "snefald" (snowfall) are also used. 'J' stands for Jul (Christmas) or julebryg (Christmas brew). Similarly, there is a P-day for påskebryg (Easter brew). In 1999, J-day moved to the first Friday in November. Traffic police laid out an alcohol control plan for that evening. In 2009 J-day was moved again to the last Friday in October, but in 2010 it returned to the first Friday in November.

In 2022, Tuborg collaborated with Chinese rappers in a project called "Why Not!".

=== Sponsorships ===
In 2008, Tuborg announced a sponsorship deal with Reading and Leeds music festivals to become their exclusive Official Beer Partner, a position held in previous years by Carling. In 2009, it also arranged an exclusive deal with The Download festival to be the official beer and have a dedicated stage named after the beer.

Tuborg also sponsors the Tuborg Image Awards, an annual music award presentation that takes place in Nepal.

== See also ==
- Philip Heyman
