= Rudolph Puggaard =

Danish merchant, patron of the arts and philanthropist

Hans Puggaard
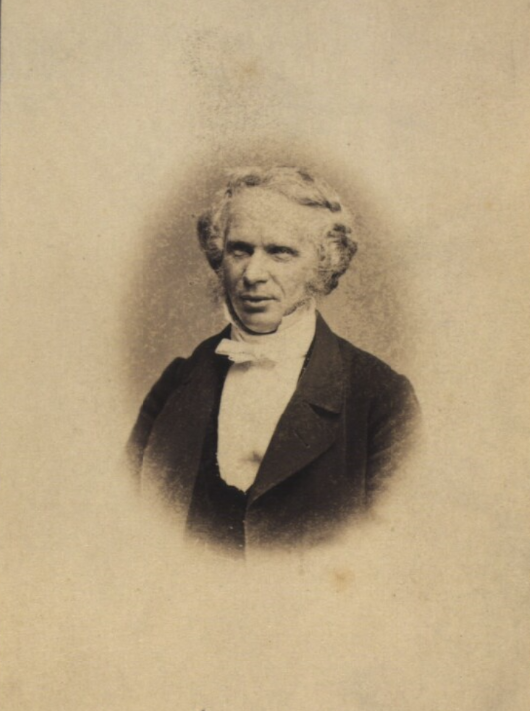
- Portrait by Frederik Ferdinand Petersen
- Born: 7 January 1818; Copenhagen, Denmark
- Died: 9 December 1885 (aged 67); Copenhagen, Denmark
- Occupations: Merchant and shipowner
- Awards: Order of the Dannebrog, 1869

Rudolph Puggaard (7 January 1818 – 9 December 1885) was a Danish merchant, patron of the arts and philanthropist.

== Early life and education ==
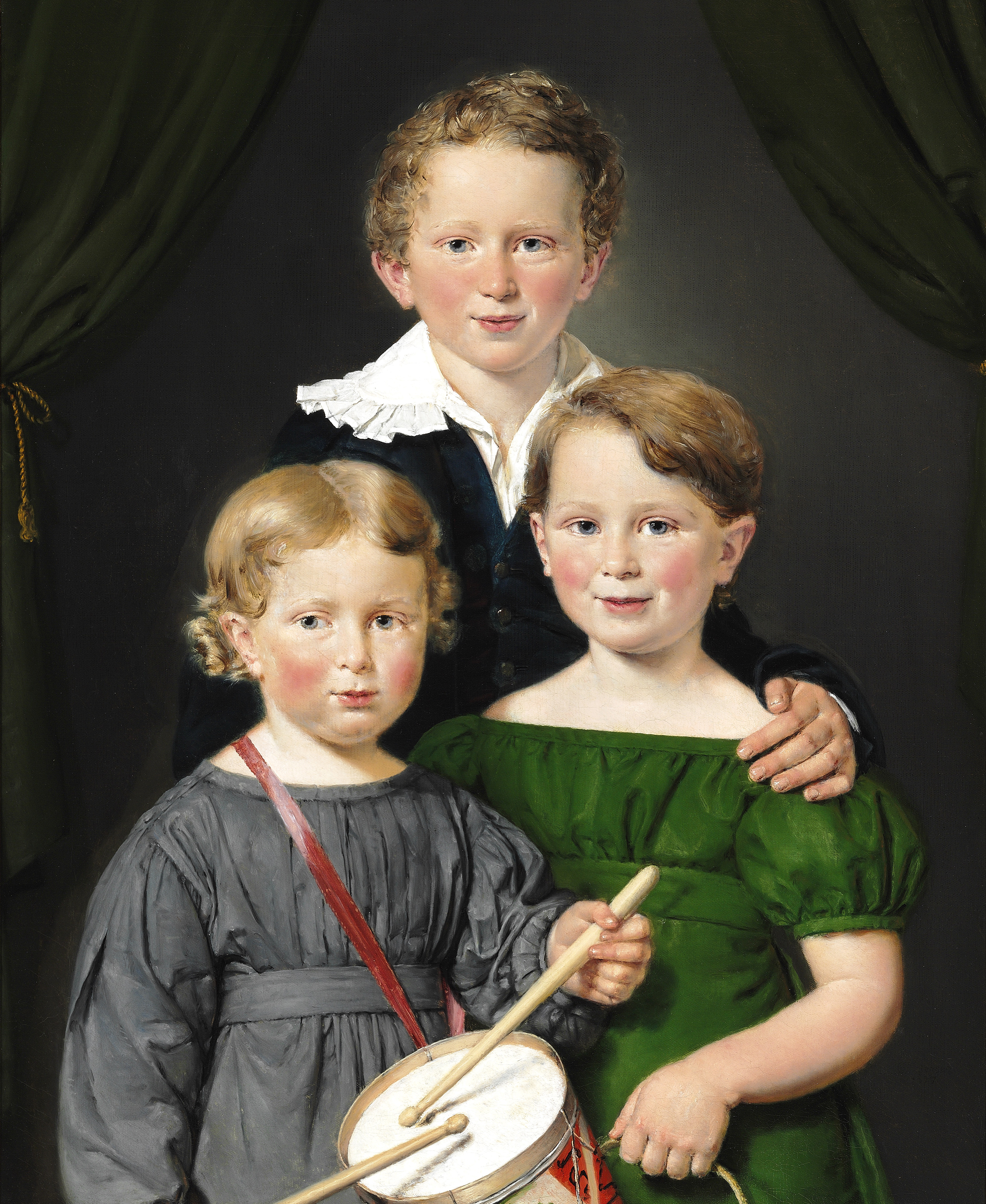
Puggaard and his two siblings painted by Christian Albrecht Jensen (1857).

Puggaard was born into a family of merchants on 7 January 1818 in Copenhagen. His father, Hans Puggaard had founded H. Puggaard & Co. in 1813. His mother, Bolette Puggaard, née Hage, a painter, was the daughter of Christopher Friedrich Hage, a wealthy merchant from Stege on Møn. He graduated from Roskilde Cathedral School in 1837 and was then trained as a merchant in Hamburg and London. His younger brother was the geologist Christopher Puggaard.

== Career ==
=== H. Puggaard & Co. ===
Back in Denmark, Puggaard joined the Nakskov office of his father's company. From 1842 he worked at the head office in Copenhagen where he after a while reached a leading position alongside his uncle, Alfred Hage. He later became the sole leader of the company. He was licensed as a merchant (løste han grossererborgerskab) in 1856.

=== Det kjøbenhavnske Skibsrederi ===
Puggaard instigated the foundation of Det kjøbenhavnske Skibsrederi in 1865. It purchased the Phønix Sugar Refinery (Rafinaderiet Phønix) at the corner of Slotsholmsgade and Christians Brygge from Bert Wilhelm Westermann. The sugar refinery had been founded by the Danish Africa Company in 1657. In 1869, the company also leased Helsingørsgade Sugar Refinery in the former street Helsingørsgade (between Adelgade and Borgergade) from William Axel Tutein. It had been acquired by Ferdinand Tutein (1789–1880) from Ludvig Surleau's estate in 1833 and passed on to him in 1859.

Det kjøbenhavnske Skibsrederi bought Helsingørsgade Sugar Refinery from Tutein in 1862 but that same year sold both their sugar refineries and other land-based activities to the newly established Danish Sugar Factories.

The remaining part of the company ran into difficulties in the 1890s and was liquidated after Puggaard's death.

=== Other ventures ===
He was a co-founder of Nye danske Brandforsikring (New Danish Fire Insurance) as well as of Kjøbenhavns Private Laanebank, where he was the chairman from its foundation until his death.

== Public offices and honours ==
Puggaard was a member of the Copenhagen City Council from 1862 to 1875. He acted as judge at the Maritime and Commercial Court (Sø- og Handelsretten) from 1862 to 1867 and was a member of Grosserer-Societetet's committee from 1876 to 1885. He was awarded the Order of the Dannebrog in 1869.

== Personal life ==
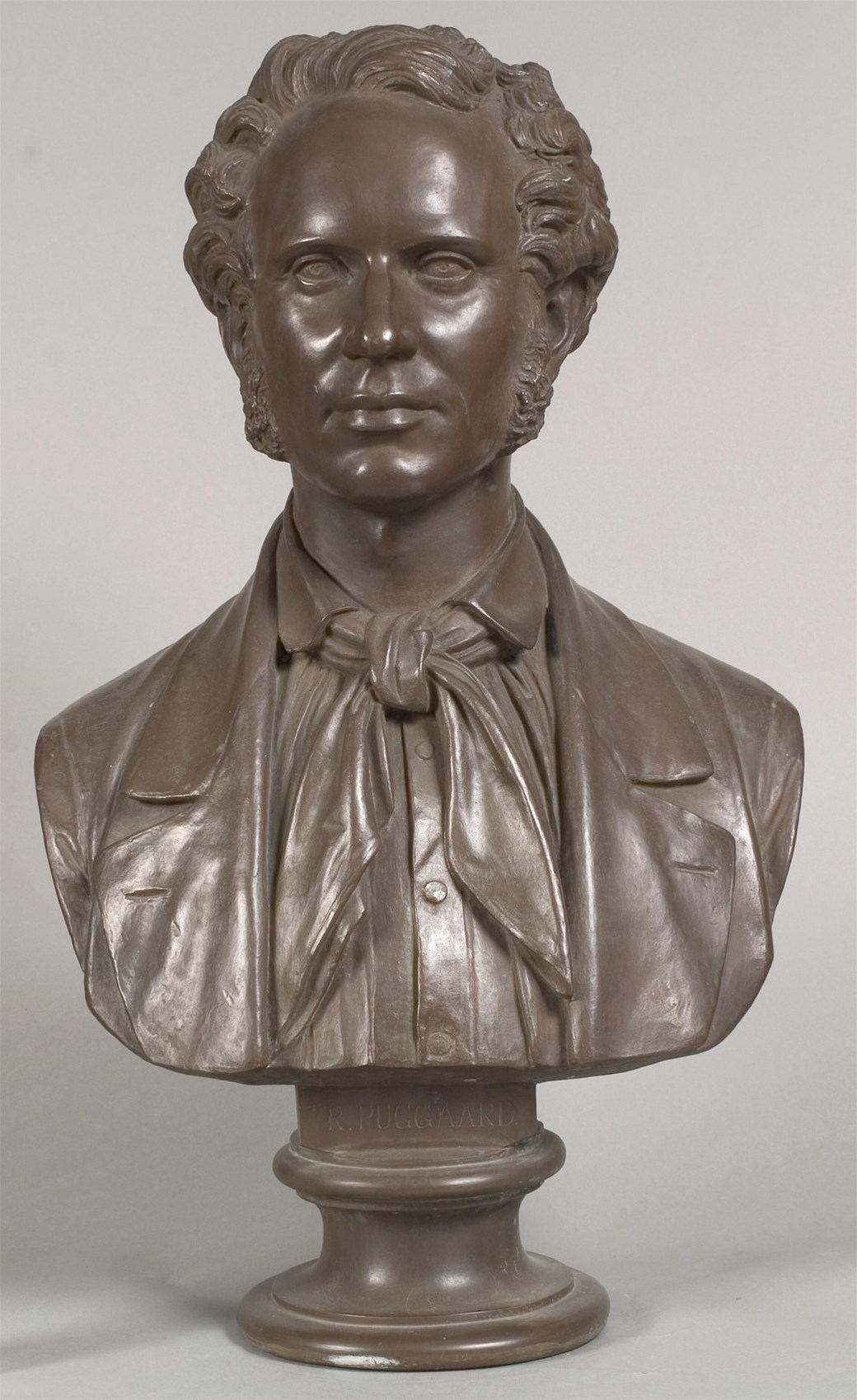
Bust of Puggaard by Herman Wilhelm Bissen

Puggaard married Casperfine Andresine (Signe) Andréa Brandt on 19 July 1843 in Stege Church. She was the adopted daughter of skipper Claus Hansen Brandt (1793–1859) and Christiane Brandt, née Kisky. Her biological parents were pilot Kaspar Andréa (1796–1824) and Anne Danielsdatter. Puggaard was survived by three children: Hans Puggaard (1845–1903), a merchant as his father, Signe Elisabeth Puggaard (1847–1899), and Bolette Puggaard (1844–1929). A daughter, Marie Christine Puggaard (1854–1877) had died young. Bolette Puggaard married the composer Emil Hartmann who composed a cantata for Rudolf and Signe Puggaard's silver anniversary (choir and piano, 1868). Signe Puggaard was the mother of the sculptor Rudolph Tegner.

The Puggaard family lived on the upper floor of the Schimmelmann Mansion (now Odd Fellows Mansion) in Bredgade in Copenhagen. After the death of his brother, the geologist Christopher Puggaard, Rudolph Puggaard took over Hjuleberg Manor in Halland, Sweden. He charged Thorvald Bindesbøll with the design of a new main building which was built in 1882–1885.

Like his parents before him, Puggaard was a strong supporter of the arts, and assisted many of the Danish "golden age" painters. He was also a philanthropist supporting various charitable institutions, among which de Puggaardske legater.
