= Nybøllegård, Møn =

19th-century cottage

- Nybøllegård
- Interactive map of the Nybøllegård, Møn area

General information
- Location: Lendemarke, Møn, Denmark
- Coordinates: 54°58′17.83″N 12°15′26.75″E
- Completed: 1856

Design and construction
- Architect: Gottlieb Bindesbøll

Nybøllegård is a 19th-century cottage situated southwest of Stege, on the island of Møn, in southeastern Denmark. It was designed by the architect Gottlieb Bindesbøll for Hother Hage in 1856. It was listed in the Danish registry of protected buildings and places in 1972.

== History ==
Christopher Friedenreich Hage was one of the wealthiest merchants on the island of Møn. His son Hother Hage pursued a career as a lawyer and politician in Copenhagen.

In 1853, Hother Hage purchased the Marielyst Mansion at Stege. On 20 June 1856, Hother Hage married Emmy Tutein, daughter of Peter Adolph Tutein, at Marienborg Manor. Around the same time, Hage had charged the architect Gottlieb Bindesbøll with the design of a new house. Bindesbøll had completed Stege's new town hall a few years prior. Another source of inspiration for the choice of Bindesbøll as architect may have been Hans Puggaard's cottage Krathuset in Ordrup. Puggaard was married to Hage's sister Bolette Hage (1798–1847). Krathuset was commissioned by Puggaard from Bindesbøll as a gift to their children, one of whom was married to the politician Orla Lehmann. Hage, Puggaard and Lehmann belonged to the same National Liberal circles.

In 1859, Hage was appointed as bailiff of Stege (byfoged) as well as of Møn Herred (herredsfoged). In 1868, he was granted royal permission to rename his property Nøbøllegård (later changed to Nybøllegård). The name is derived from the name of the nearby settlement of Nybølle.

Hage's already fragile health was weakened by his many outdoor duties following the 1872 Baltic Sea flood. He died at Nybøllegård on 9 February 1873. His widow married Ditlev Gothard Monrad.

Anders Peter Andersen, a lieutenant and architect, resided at Nybøllegård at the time of the 1880 census. He lived there with his wife Christiane (née Frederiksen) and their two children.

The building was remodeled in around 1900 and again in 1960. It has since 1999 been subject to comprehensive restoration work.

== Architecture ==
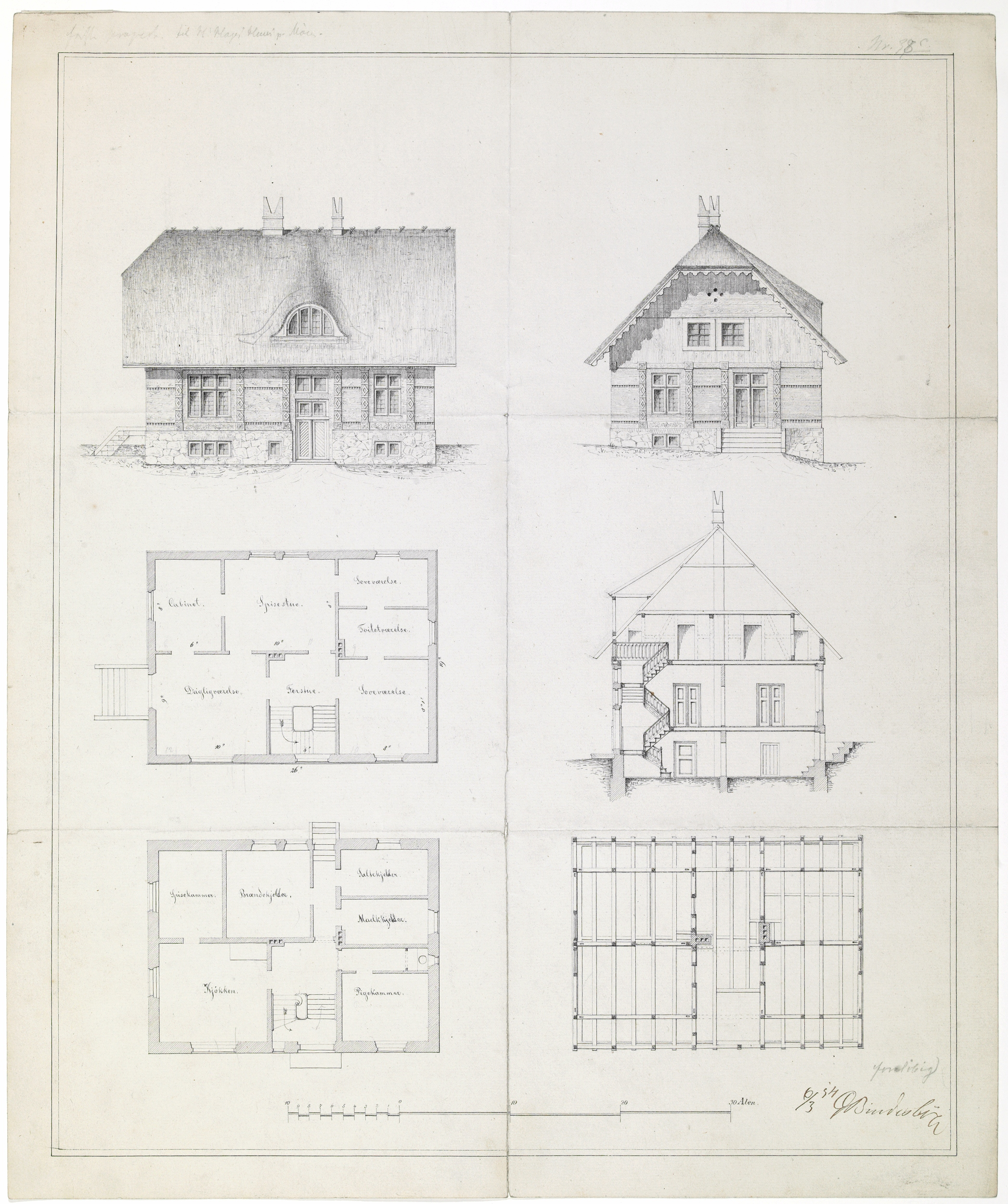
One of Bindesbøll's renderings.

The building is one of Bindesbøll's six so-called "cottages". It is a rectangular, single-storey building constructed on a foundation of boulders, with a broad lower band of red brick and yellow brick on the upper part of the ground floor. The garden side features an avant-corps with a gabled dormer window. The south gable of the building features a veranda and a balcony. The quarter-hipped roof with ornamental Bargeboars was originally thatched. It was later replaced with wooden shingles and now with roofing felt.

The ground floor interiors were decorated by Georg Hilker in Pompeian Styles.

== Today ==
Nybøllegård is today owned by Thomas Christfort, a former conservative MP and current member of Vordingborg Municipal Council, who is also the owner of Overgård Manor in Jutland. He has established a storage facility for grain on the property. In 2016, he ceded the management of the company to his son Helge Christfort.
