= The Danish Constituent Assembly =

Painting by Constantin Hansen

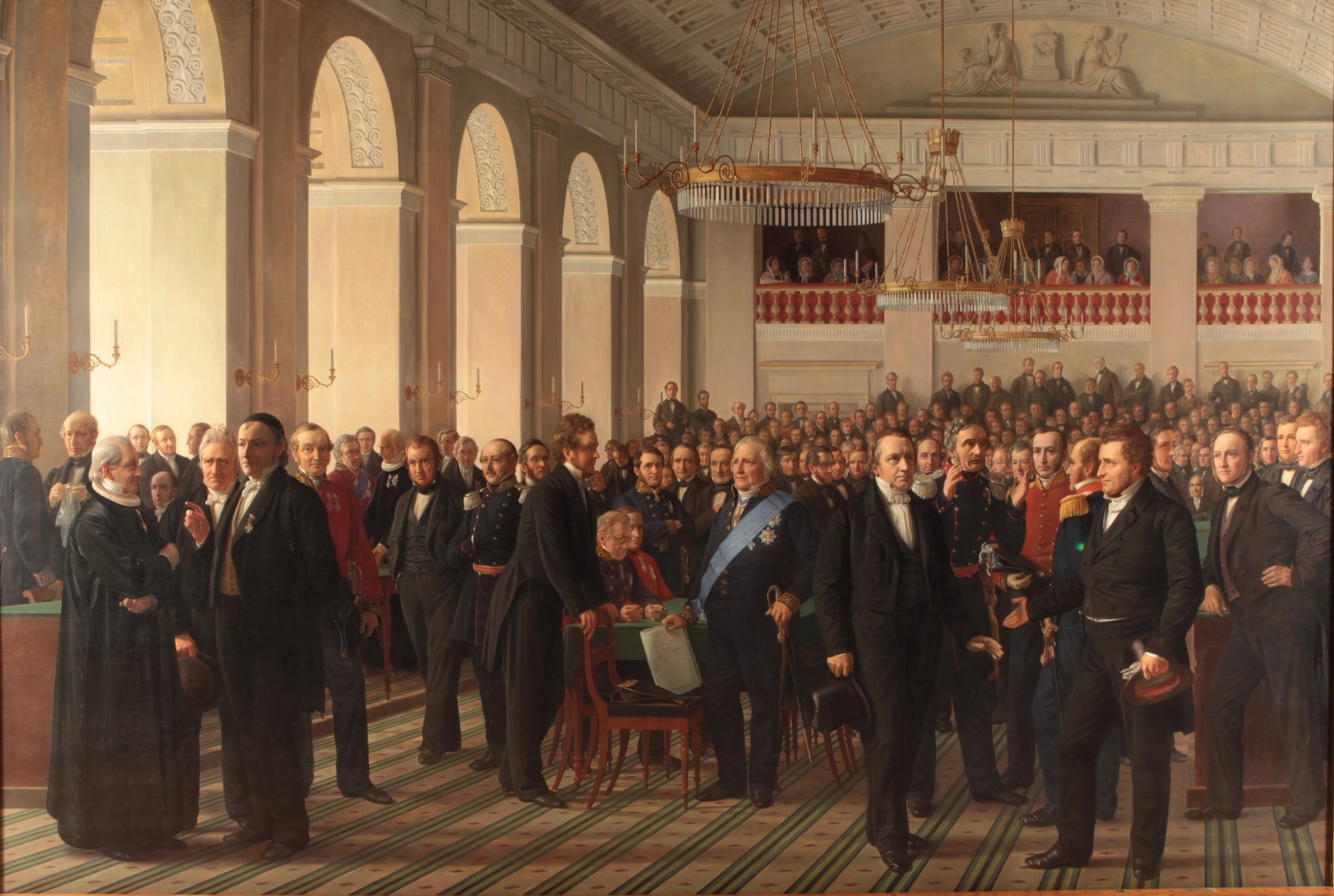
- Artist: Constantin Hansen
- Year: 1860–1864
- Medium: Oil on canvas
- Dimensions: 338 cm × 500 cm (133 in × 200 in)
- Location: Frederiksborg Museum, Copenhagen

The Danish Constituent Assembly (Danish: Den Grundlovsgivende Rigsforsamling) is a monumental oil painting by Constantin Hansen depicting the Danish Constituent Assembly's first meeting on 23 October 1848 at Christiansborg Palace in Copenhagen, Denmark. The painting was commissioned by merchant and National Liberal politician Afred Hage in 1860 and later donated by his widow to the Museum of National History at Frederiksborg Castle in Hillerød where it is now on display.

== History ==
Alfred Hage's homes in Copenhagen and in Stokkerup on the Øresund coast were frequented by writers, artists, politicians and actors. Hage's brother, Hother Hage, himself a politician, introduced him to other National Liberal leaders. Hage made his homes available to political salons and hosted confidential meetings between leading politicians of the time. His niece, Annette Marie Bolette Puggaard, was from 1844 married to Orla Lehmann who was one of the principal writers of the constitution in 1848–49. It was Lehmann who first presented Hage with the idea of commissioning the painting of the founding fathers at Christiansborg Palace. Hage commissioned the painting from Constantin Hansen in 1860. Hansen had previously painted several portraits of Hage and his family.

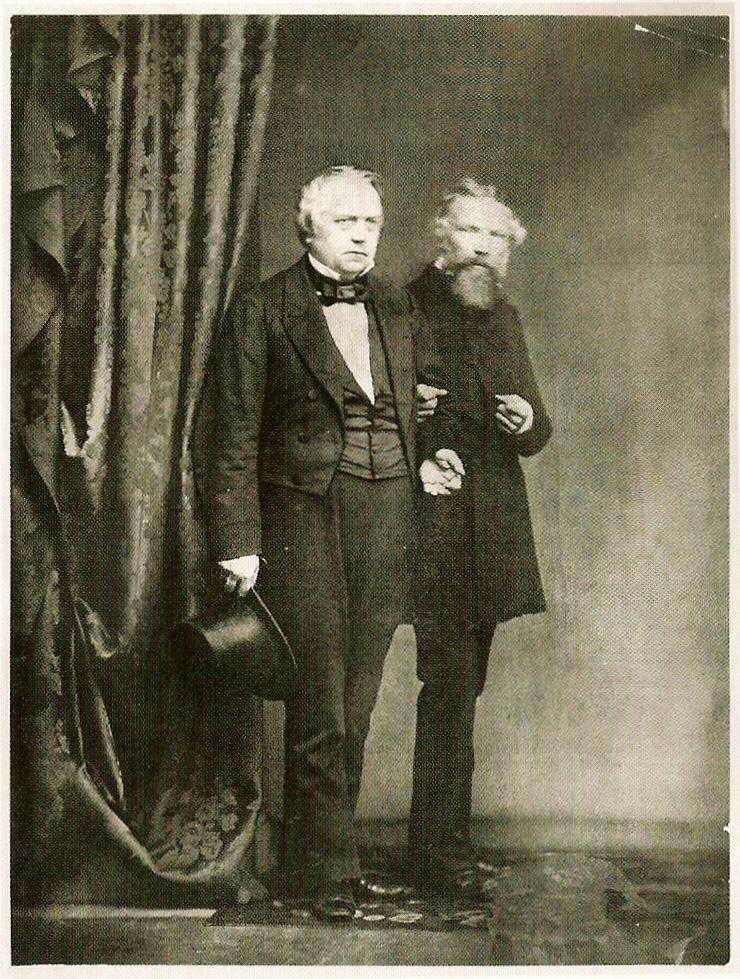
Monrag og Constantin Hansen: The photograph that Hansen used as a model for his portrail of Monrad

Painting an event that took place 12 years back, Hansen had to rely on old photographs, drawings and even busts in his work with painting the many portraits. The monumental painting was completed in late 1864 or early 1865.

The painting was after its completion installed in Hage's home in the Harsdorff House on Kongens Nytorv. It was from 31 May to 14 June possible for the public to see the painting in his home on the payment of an entrance fee the revenues of which went to veterans of the Second Schleswig War. A total of 2,898 people visited the exhibition over the two week period.

On 11 November 1865, The newspaper Fædrelandet brought an article written by Philip Weilbach about the painting.

The painting hang in Hage's home until his widow donated it to the Danish state.

== Description ==
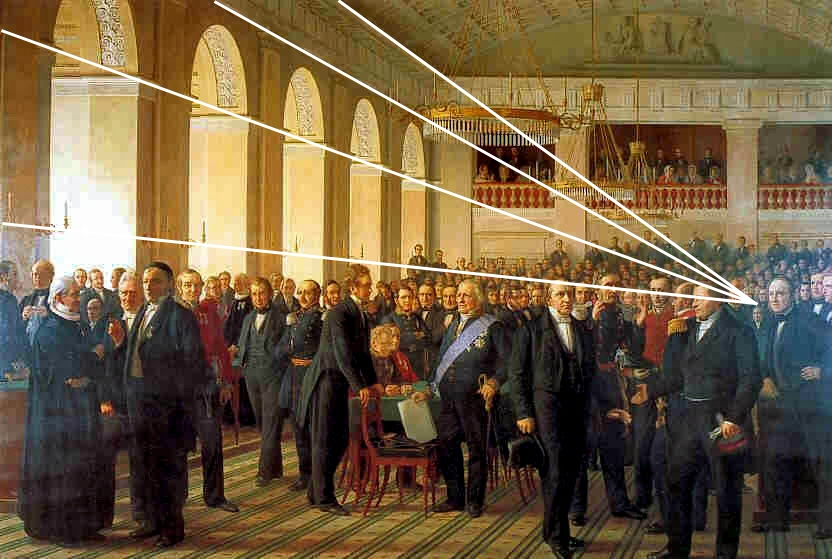
The perspective

The painting depicts the Danish Constituent Assembly during its first meeting on 23 October 1848 at the old Christiansborg Palace which was destroyed by fire in 1884. Around 100 of the 154 members of the assembly can be identified in the picture. Lehmann, who is seen in the bottom right corner, gesticulating with his right hand, was not a member of the Assembly. N. F. S. Grundtvig, who also features prominently in the composition, was not elected until a byelection in November and was thus also not present at the meeting. His head is placed in the vanishing point of the picture.

Henrik Nicolai Clausen and Joakim Frederik Schouw can be seen in the bottom left corner of the painting. Prime minister Adam Wilhelm Moltke, representing the "old system# stands in the centre but a little further back. He is faced by Carl Christian Hall who rests his hands on the back of a chair.

== Exhibition ==
In 2018, Frederiksborg Museum arranged an exhibition about the painting. It lasted until 29 August.

== Other versions ==
Constantin Hansen painted a number of sketches and portrait studies before embarking on the final painting. Several of them are now located in Christiansborg Palace. His fourth sketch is in terms of composition almost identical to the final painting. It is now located in the Folketing.

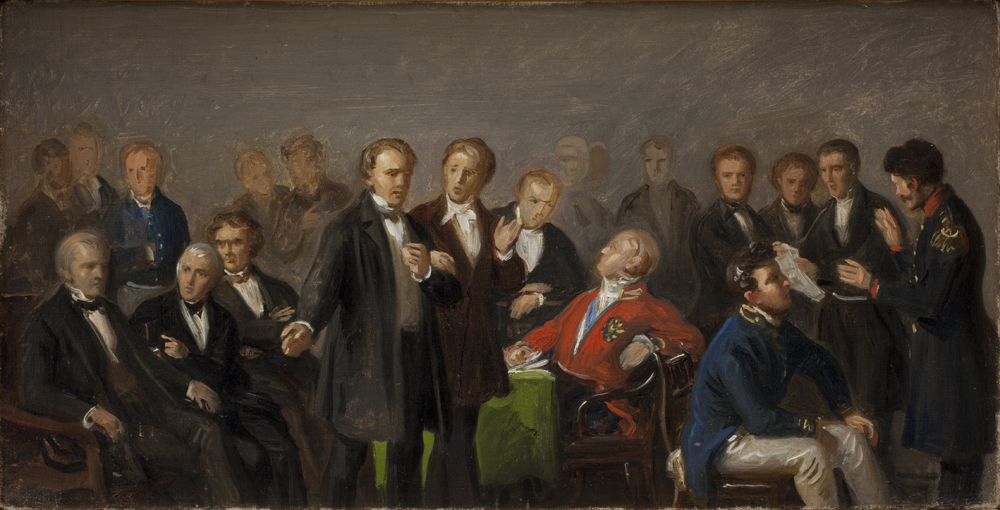
Danish National Gallery: Study for the painting

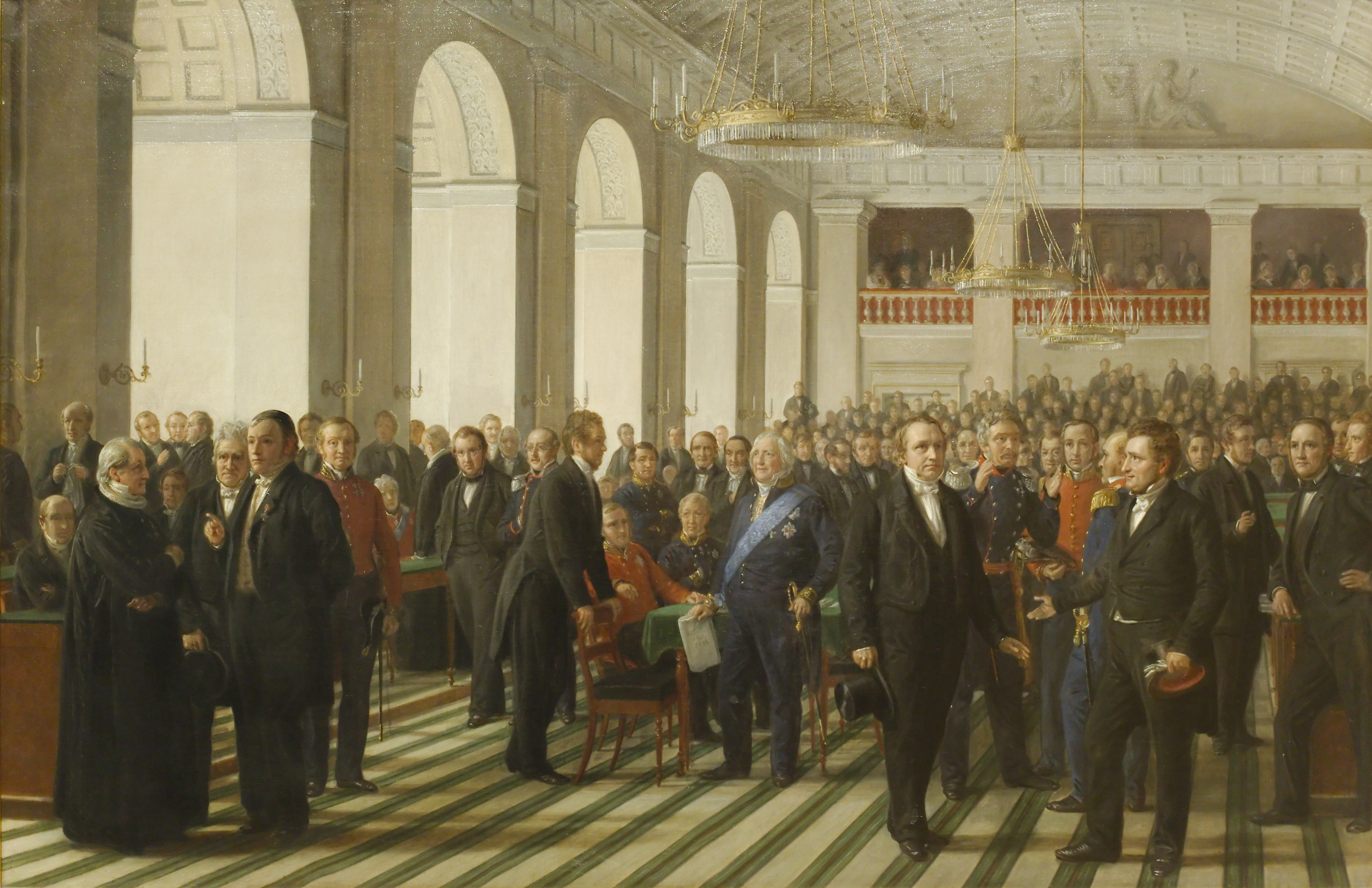
Folketinget: Study for the painting

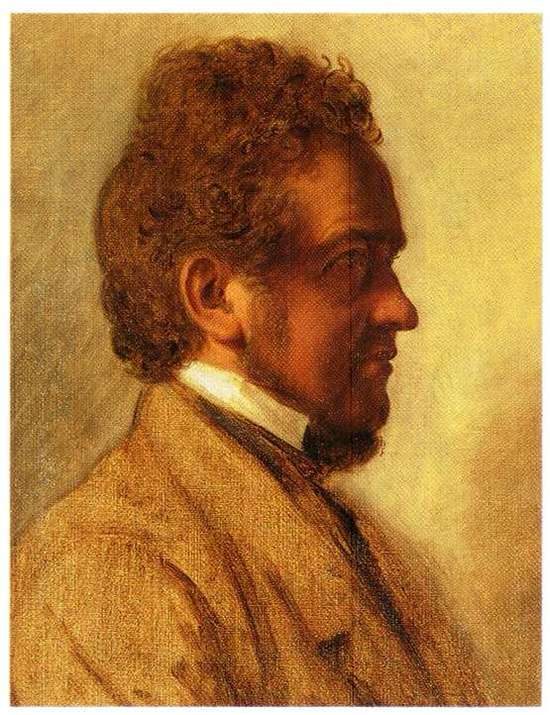
C. C. Hall

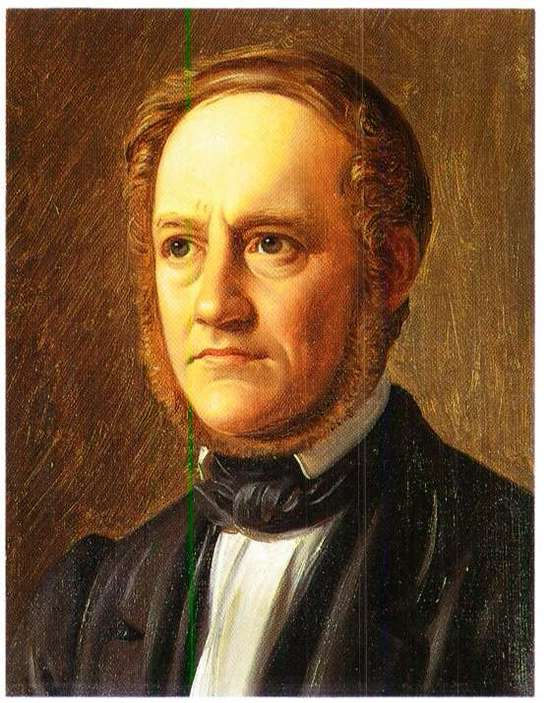
Carl Ploug

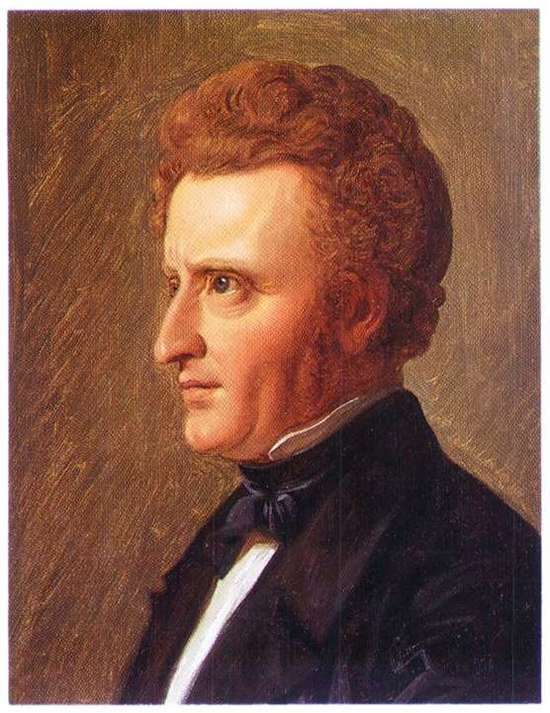
Hother Hage
