= Bolette Puggaard =

Danish painter (1798–1847)

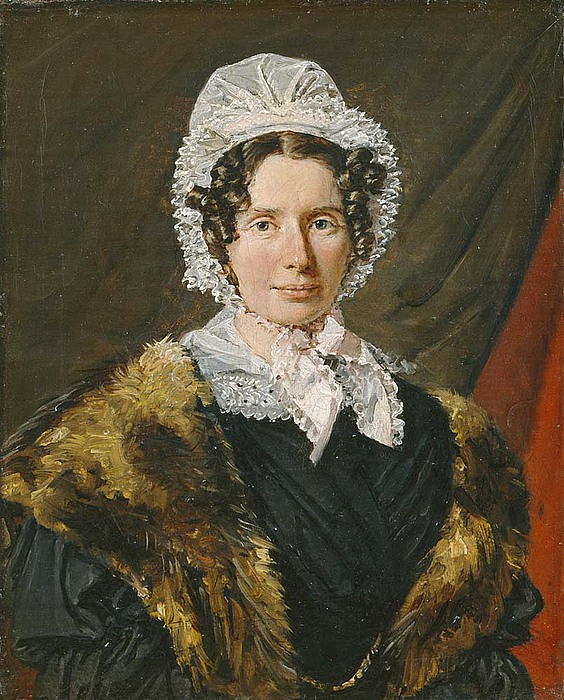
- Portrait of Bolette Puggard by Christian Albrecht Jensen (c. 1838)
- Born: Bolette Cathrine Frederikke Hage; February 7, 1798; Stege, Denmark
- Died: September 11, 1847 (aged 49); Copenhagen, Denmark
- Resting place: Holmen Cemetery
- Spouse: Hans Puggaard (m. 1816)
- Children: Rudolph Puggaard; Christopher Puggaard; Annette Maria Lehmann
- Father: Christopher Friedenreich Hage
- Relatives: Alfred Hage (brother); Hother Hage (brother); Johannes Dam Hage (brother)

Bolette Cathrine Frederikke Puggaard née Hage (1798–1847) was a landscape painter and one of very few 19th-century Danish women whose art extended beyond flower paintings. She and her husband, the merchant and shipowner Hans Puggaard, are remembered for their philanthropic activities as well as supporting many of the painters of the Danish Golden Age.

== Personal life ==
Born on 7 February 1798 in Stege on the island of Møn, Bolette Cathrine Frederikke Hage was the daughter of the merchant Christopher Friedenreich Hage (1759–1849) and Christiane Arnette Just (1778–1866). She was the eldest of the family's 10 children. In 1830, she received private tuition in painting under the celebrated artist Christoffer Wilhelm Eckersberg.

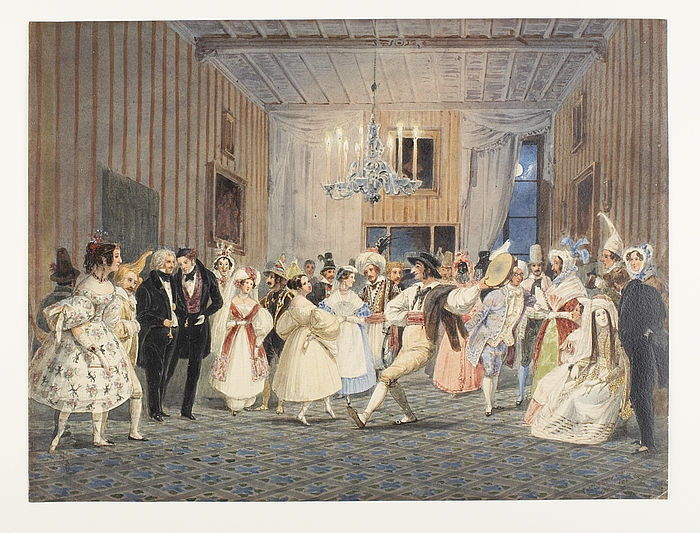
Painting of a carnival being held at the Puggaard's residence in Rome by Carl Werner, 1836

On 13 August 1816, she married the wealthy merchant Hans Puggaard (1788–1866) with whom she enjoyed a substantial degree of freedom, allowing her to develop her interest and proficiency in landscape painting. Together with her husband, she socialized with many of the most prominent cultural and intellectual figures of the day, inviting them to their home on Store Kongensgade in central Copenhagen or their country home Skovgaard in Ordrup. The houses were exquisitely decorated and the walls covered with the best paintings of the time. The couple were among the patrons who supported the leading contemporary Danish artists, including among many others Constantin Hansen, Wilhelm Marstrand, Jørgen Roed, Jørgen Sonne and Herman Wilhelm Bissen.

After suffering from tuberculosis for some time, she died of influenza on 10 November 1847 in Copenhagen before she could see the abolition of absolutism. She is buried in Holmen Cemetery and was survived by her three children, the merchant Rudolph Puggaard (1818–1883), the geologist Christopher Puggaard (1823–1864), and Annette Maria Lehmann (1821–1849). Annette Maria was an artist herself who also studied with Christoffer Wilhelm Eckersberg.

Many of her descendants were reputed artists, such as the poet Helge Rode (1870–1937), the writer Jacob Paludan (1896–1975), the painter Oluf Hartmann (1879–1910), and the sculptor Rudolph Tegner (1873–1950).

== Career and philanthropy ==
When visiting Rome with her family in 1835–36, she met several Danish painters and painted a number of landscapes. She and her husband developed a close friendship with sculptor Bertel Thorvaldsen. The two were the main initiators and artisans of the creation of the Thorvaldsen museum in Copenhagen.

Bolette Puggaard exhibited at the Charlottenborg Spring Exhibition in 1838, 1844 and 1845. Her works were later included in the 1895 Copenhagen Women's Exhibition.

Bolette was also politically engaged and strongly opposed to absolutism. When the Thorvaldsen museum was inaugurated, she put the French tricolour on the top of the building, claiming to be ready to defend this action even in front of the King if needed. Her view was that "it was Thorvaldsen who brought freedom in the arts, and it is our most noble duty to fight for it". Her passion for democracy was inspired by her brother Johannes Dam Hage, a leading defendant of the abolition of absolutism in Denmark who killed himself after having been condemned to censorship for life. Her son in law Orla Lehmann, married to her daughter Maria, and later one of the main authors of the Danish liberal Constitution of 1848, had also been jailed for his democratic ideas.

== Gallery ==
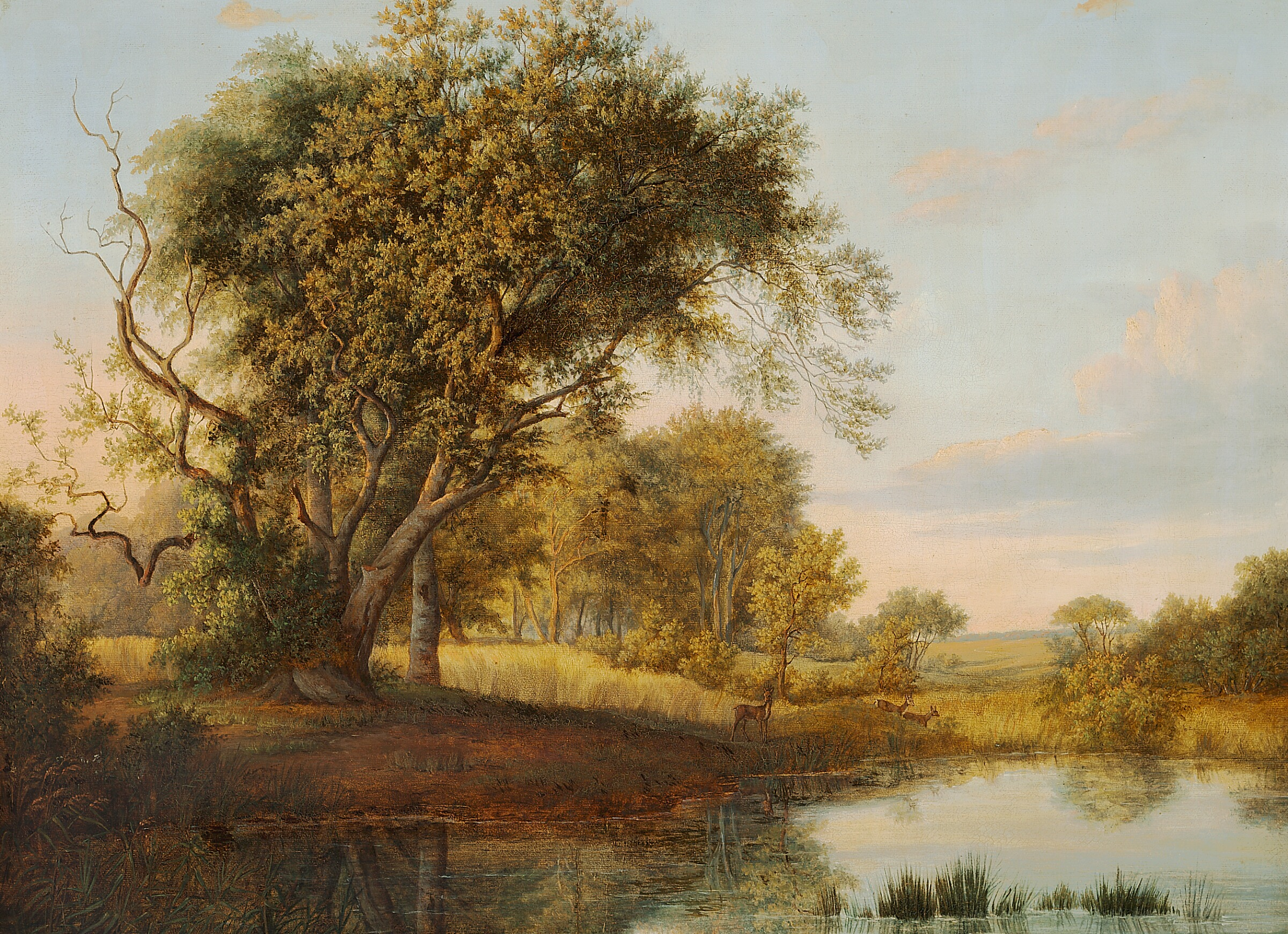
Parti fra Ordrup Mose, c. 1820–1840

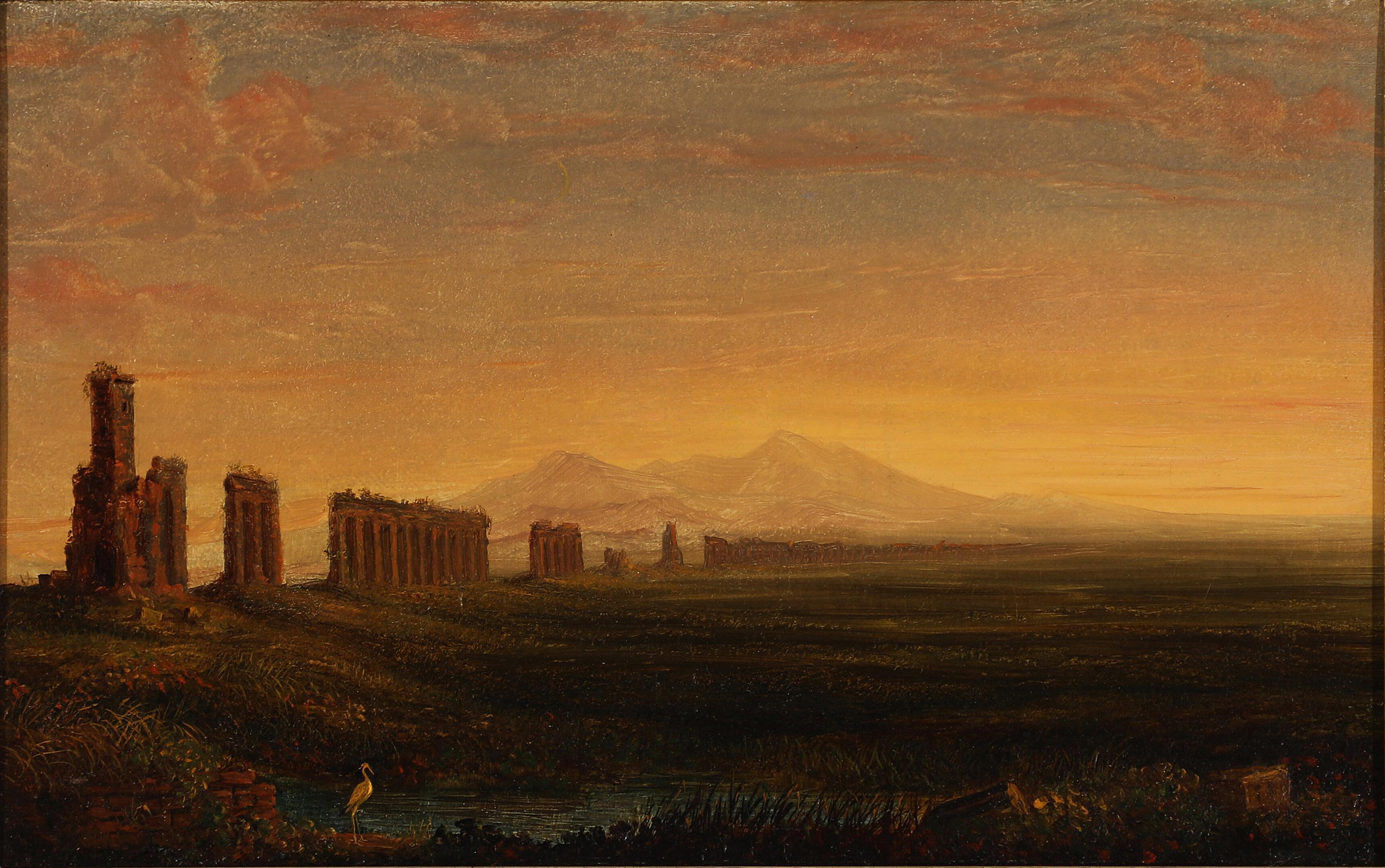
Fra den romerske campagne, c. 1830

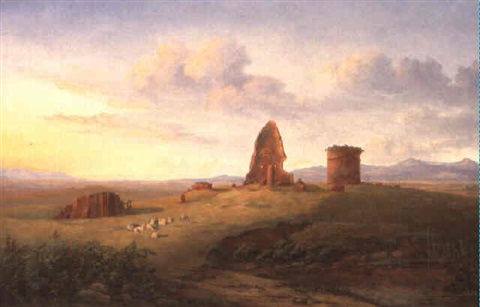
Fra den romerske Campagne, 1838

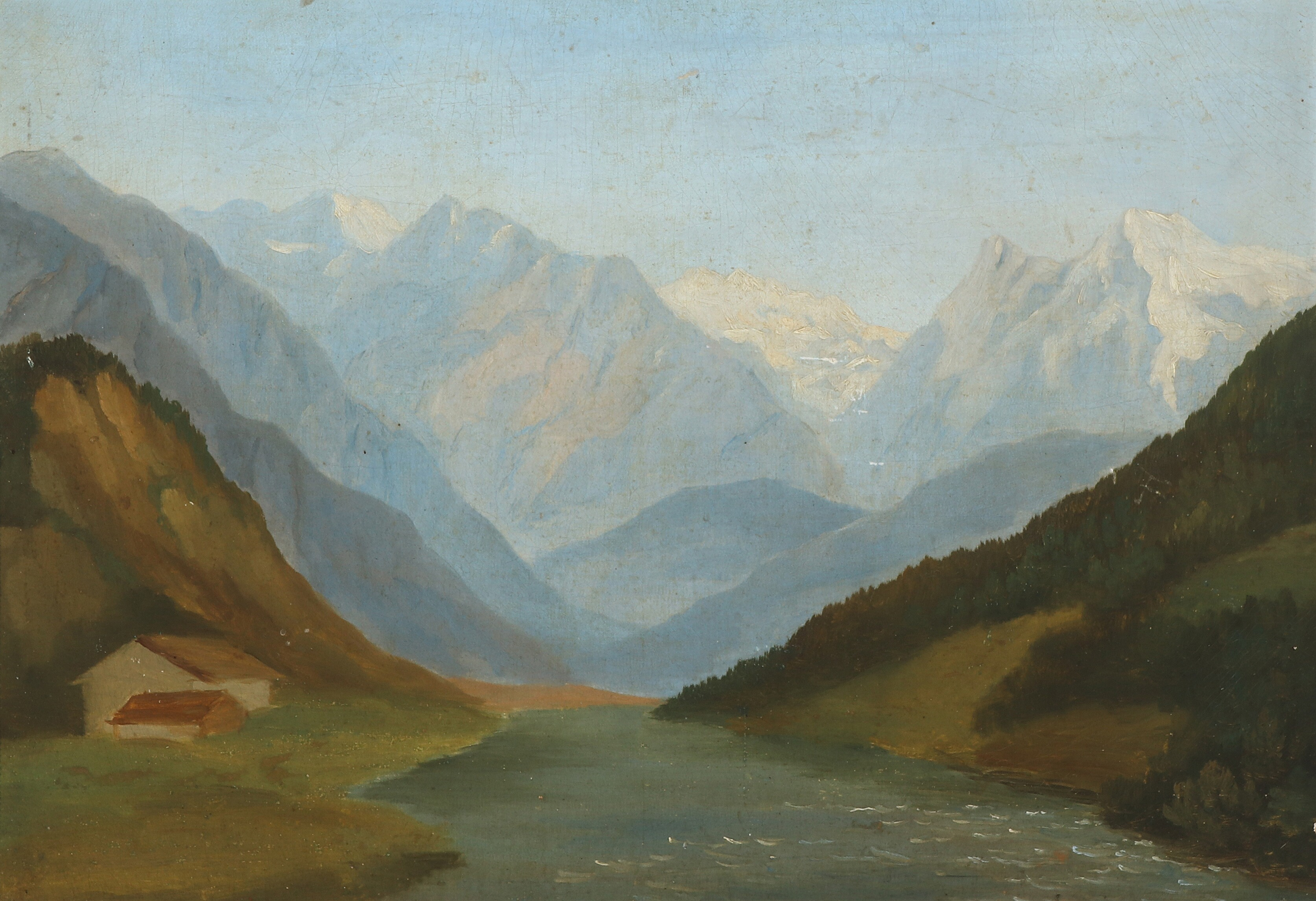
Etschdalen set fra Varenna, 1835

Vue fra et herskabeligt interiør med ud gennem et par åbne døre til en altan med en lille pige og videre ud over Napoli Bugten
