= Johannes Dam Hage =

Danish journalist

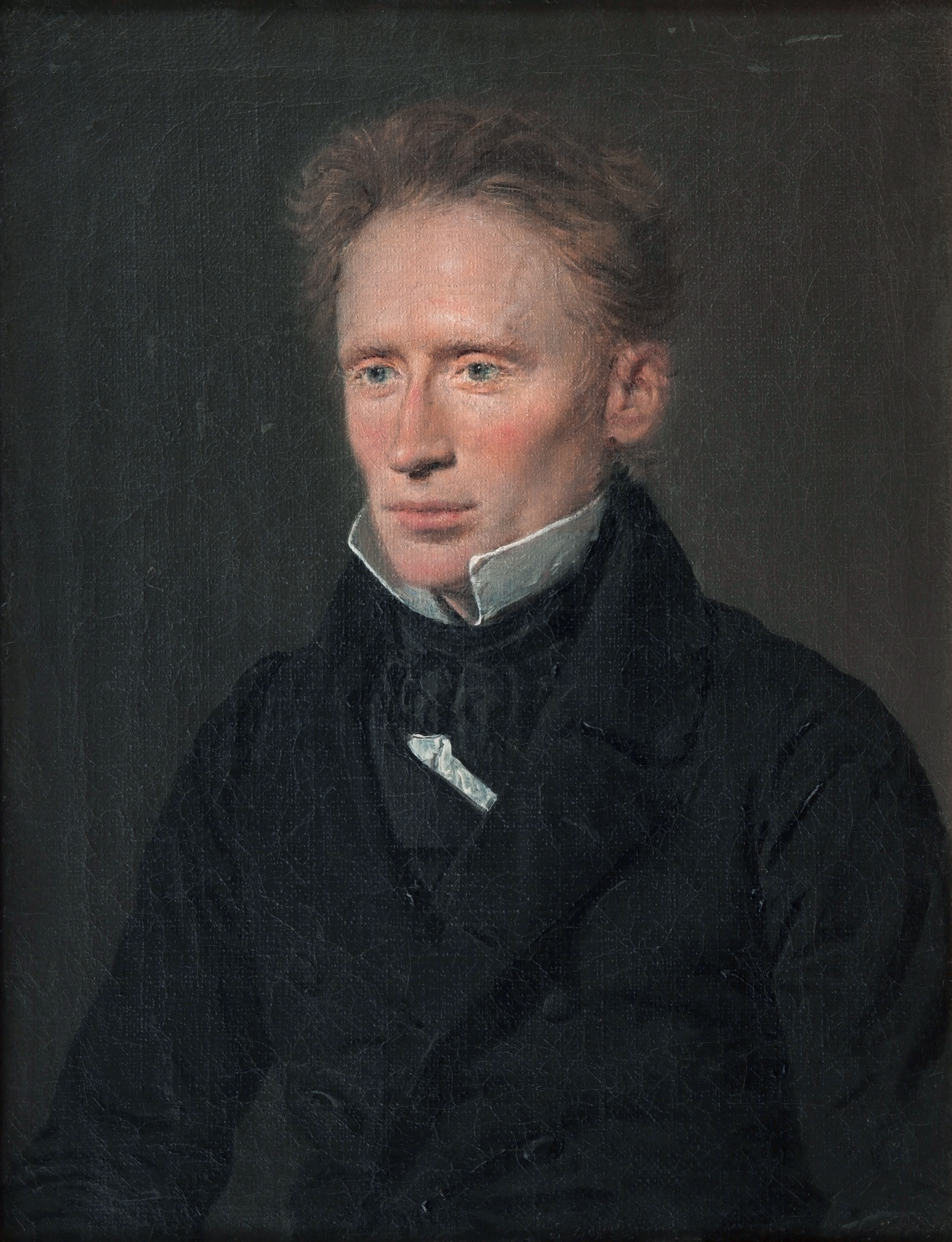
- Portrait of Hage by C. A. Jensen, 1837.
- Born: 2 April 1800; Stege, Denmark
- Died: 16 September 1837 (aged 37); Copenhagen, Denmark
- Occupations: Journalist, politician

Johannes Dam Hage (2 April 1800 – 16 September 1837) was founder and editor-in-chief of the Danish republican journal Fædrelandet which had a decisive influence on the establishment in Denmark of a constitutional monarchy.

== Biography ==
Johannes Dam Hage was born in Stege on Møn, the eldest son of Christopher Friedenreich Hage and Christiane Arnette Just (1778–1866).

Hage initially attended Nykøbing Latin School. He later moved with the headmaster S. N. J. Bloch to Roskilde Cathedral School from where he matriculated in 1817. In 1824, he earned his Candidate of Theology degree from the University of Copenhagen. He had in the meantime also assisted his father in the family's trading firm and worked as a house tutor. After his graduation, he again worked as a house tutor. In 1825, he was appointed as alumnus of Borchs Kollegium.

After some years spent as a teacher at the Cathedral School of Roskilde, he founded the political journal Fædrelandet together with his friend Christian Georg Nathan David. Hage became shortly thereafter the paper's editor-in-chief. His brothers Alfred Hage, Christopher Hage and Hother Hage, as well as his nephews Orla Lehmann and Carl Ploug, were also at the forefront of those who fought for the establishment of a democratic constitution in Denmark. On 26 June 1837, Hage was condemned to censorship for life by the Danish Supreme Court. Following this judgment, he took his own life on 16 September 1837. He is buried in Greyfriars Cemetery in Roskilde.

== Legacy ==
C.A. Jensen painted in 1837 a portrait of Johannes Dam Hage which is today exhibited in Nivaagaards Malerisamling.

== Bibliography ==
A. Thorsøe in 1st edition of Dansk Biografisk Leksikon, 6. vol., page 459, edited by C.F. Bricka, Gyldendal (1887–1905).

S.N. J. Bloch, Træk af overlærer Johannes Hages Levnet og Karakter, 1837

C.D. David, in Fædrelandet 21.9, 14.10 and 11.11 1837

Hother Hage, Johannes Hage, 1854

J.A. Hansen, Politiske Skildringer I,1854, P. 55–78

J.P. Mynster, Meddelelser om mit levnet, 1854, 2nd edition 1884, P.252

G.P. Brammer, Ungdomsliv, 1884, p. 172-77

Hother Ploug, Carl Ploug, 1905

KHans Jensen, De stænderforsamlings historie, I, 1931
