= Hother Hage =

Danish politician and lawyer

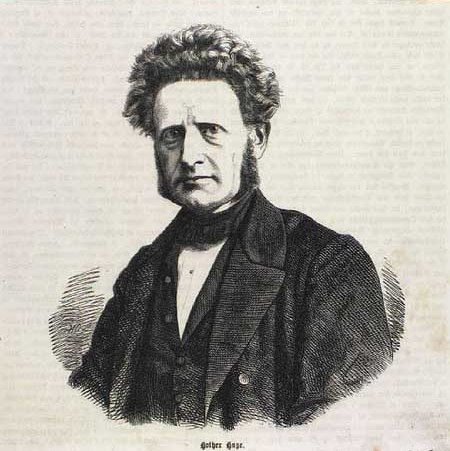

Edvard Philip Hother Hage (born 9 January 1816 in Stege, and deceased on 9 February 1873 in Møn) was a Danish politician and lawyer.

== Biography ==
Hother Hage was the son of Christopher Friedenreich Hage and Arnette Christiane Just and was thus a member of one of the leading liberal families in Denmark. As a journalist, Hage was a regular contributor for the national liberal newspapers Fædrelandet and Dansk Folketidende. Economically, he was a strong advocate of free trade. Politically, he belonged to the moderate liberal school and Alexis de Tocqueville was his model. Together with his brothers Johannes Dam Hage and Alfred Hage, as well as his nephews Orla Lehmann and Carl Ploug, he was one of the main proponents of the democratisation of Denmark. He exercised his most prominent role as member of the Roskilde Stænder in April and May 1848 where the law for the election of the Danish Constituent Assembly was adopted, and later became one of the members appointed by the King in that Assembly. This allowed him to contribute significantly to the passing of the new Constitution of 5 June 1849, establishing a bicameral parliament with a directly elected lower house and an indirectly elected upper house. Hother Hage was repeatedly elected to the Folketing. He refused however the post of Minister of Justice when offered to him in 1863 by Monrad.

Hother Hage was an admirer and friend of Søren Kierkegaard.

In 1853, he bought the Marielyst Mansion in Stege, which he renamed Nybøllegaard (now Nybøllegård) and which was rebuilt at his request in 1854 by Michael Gottlieb Bindesbøll.

== Iconography ==
Hother Hage is shown in the famous painting by Constantin Hansen of the Danish Constituent Assembly.
