= Gammel Skovgård, Gentofte Municipality =

Gammel Skovgård
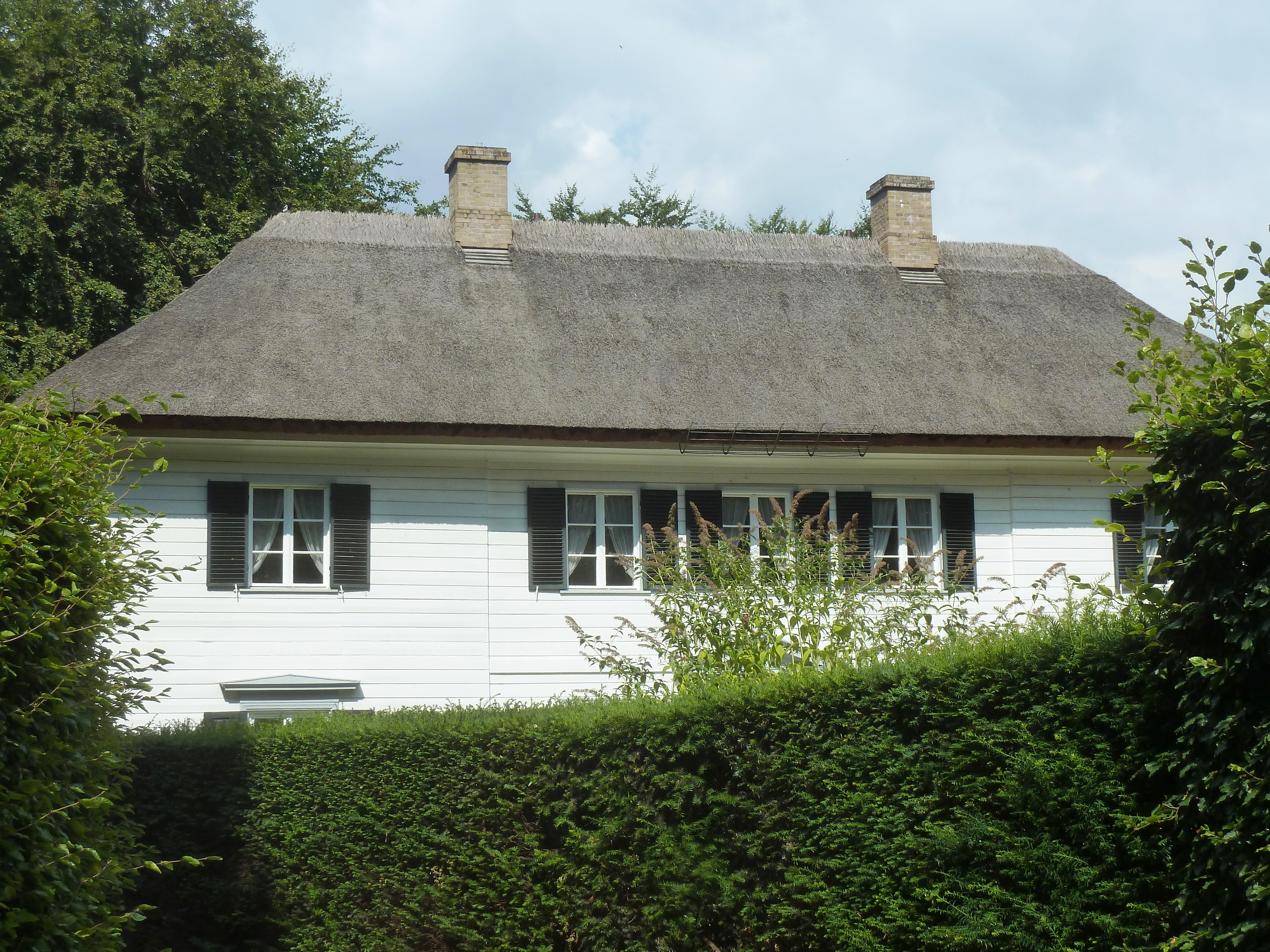

General information
- Location: Ordrup, Gentofte Municipality, Denmark
- Coordinates: 55°46′11.35″N 12°34′21.19″E
- Completed: 1812

Gammel Skovgård is a former country house in Gentofte Municipality in the northern suburbs of Copenhagen, Denmark. It was originally located at the site where Skovgård School in Ordrup is now located but moved to its current site at Krathusvej 36 when the school was built in the 1950s.

== History ==
=== Origins ===
Peter von Scholten purchased an estate in Ordrup for use as a country house in around 1811. The building now known as Gammel Skovgaard was constructed for him in around 1820.

=== Puggaard family ===
In 1831 it was acquired by the merchant Hans Puggaard who spent the summers there with his painter wife Bolette. Their visitors included many leading artists of the Danish Golden Age, including C. W. Eckersberg, Vilhelm Marstrand, Bertel Thorvaldsen, Michael Gottlieb Bindesbøll and Herman Wilhelm Bissen.

After Hans and Bolette Puggaard's daughter Marie married the politician Orla Lehmann in 1844 the estate was also frequented by many of the leading politicians of the time. Lehmann was a key figure in the adoption of the Constitution of Denmark in 1849. As a gift to his children, Puggaard also commissioned the architect Michael Gottlieb Bindesbøll to build another country house in the area. It was named Krathuset for its location in Ordrup Krat.

=== Gotfred Rode ===
After Puggaard's death in 1866, Skovgård was taken over by his grand daughter Margrethe Lehmann together with her husband Gotfred Rode. Rode, a prominent literary historian, created a meetingplace for Grundtvigian and National Liberal opinion leaders.

In 1874 Rode established a folk high school in a new building on the estate. The folk high school closed after his death in 1878.

The businessman Johannes Golm and his family rented a summer residence on the estate from 1868 to 1880. Golm was the owner of the trading firm Thøger From.

=== Frederik and Jacob Hegel ===
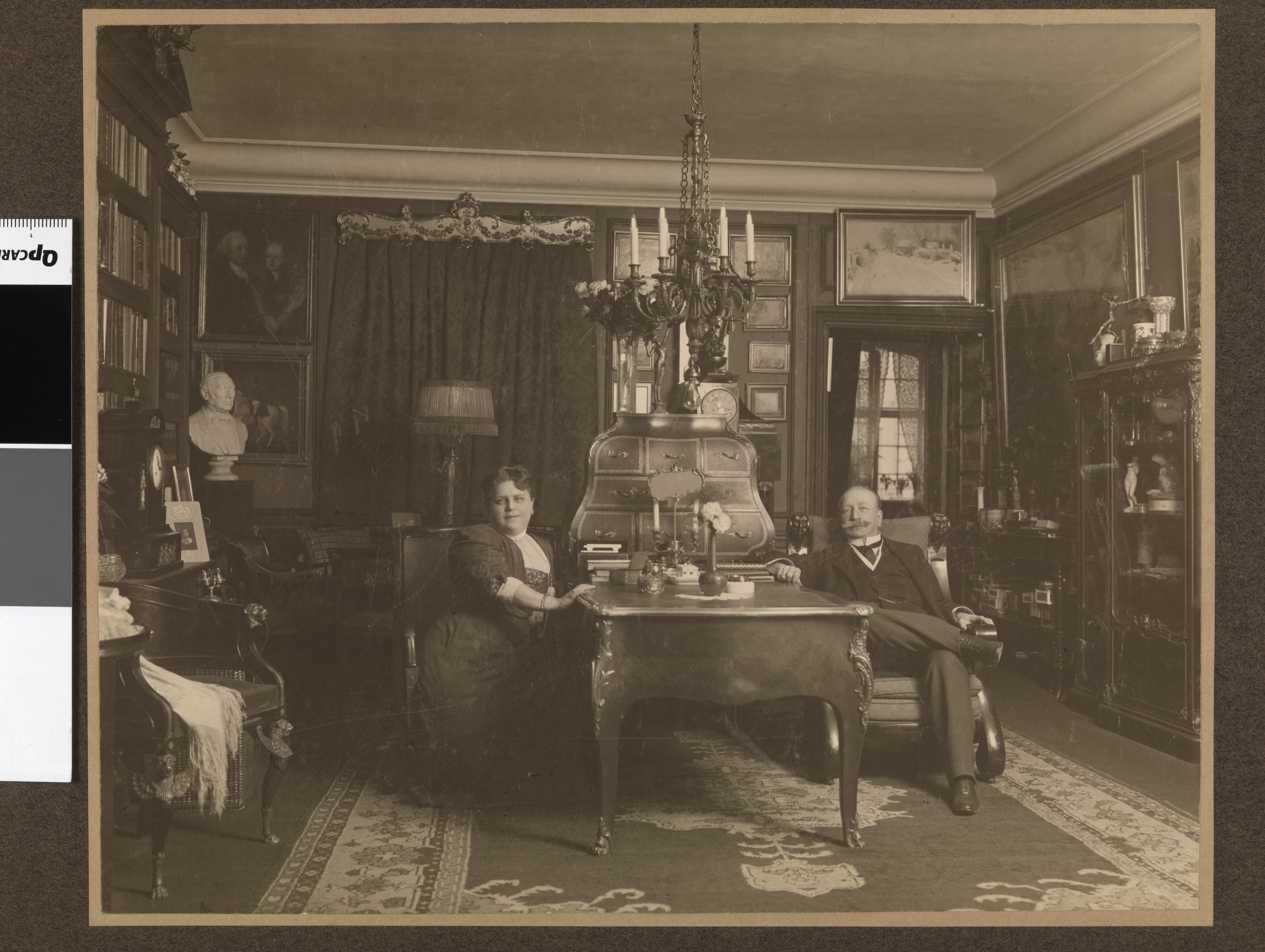
Jacob and Julie Hegel at Skovgaard. 10++.

In 1880 Skovgård was acquired by Frederik V. Hegel, owner of Gyldendal. He used it as a summer residence together with his son and daughter-in-law Jacob and Julie Hegel. The house remained a meetingplace for Copenhagen's literary establishment until the 1920s. After that it was for a while left empty.

Jacob Hegel's son Frederik Hegel Jr. parted with Skovgaard in 19127. He had by then constructed the country house now known as Hegnslund at Springforbi.

=== Later history ===
In the 1940, Skovgård was purchased by Gentofte Municipality whose intention was to build a new primary school at the central location in the growing suburb. The house was listed and it was therefore decided to move it to a new located at Krathusvej 36. The house was later refurbished by Mogens Lassen. Skovgårdsskolen

The Skovgård School was inaugurated at the old site in 1951. It was designed by the architects Hans Erling Langkilde and Ib Martin Jensen.
