= Balthazar Christensen =

Danish lawyer (1802–1882)

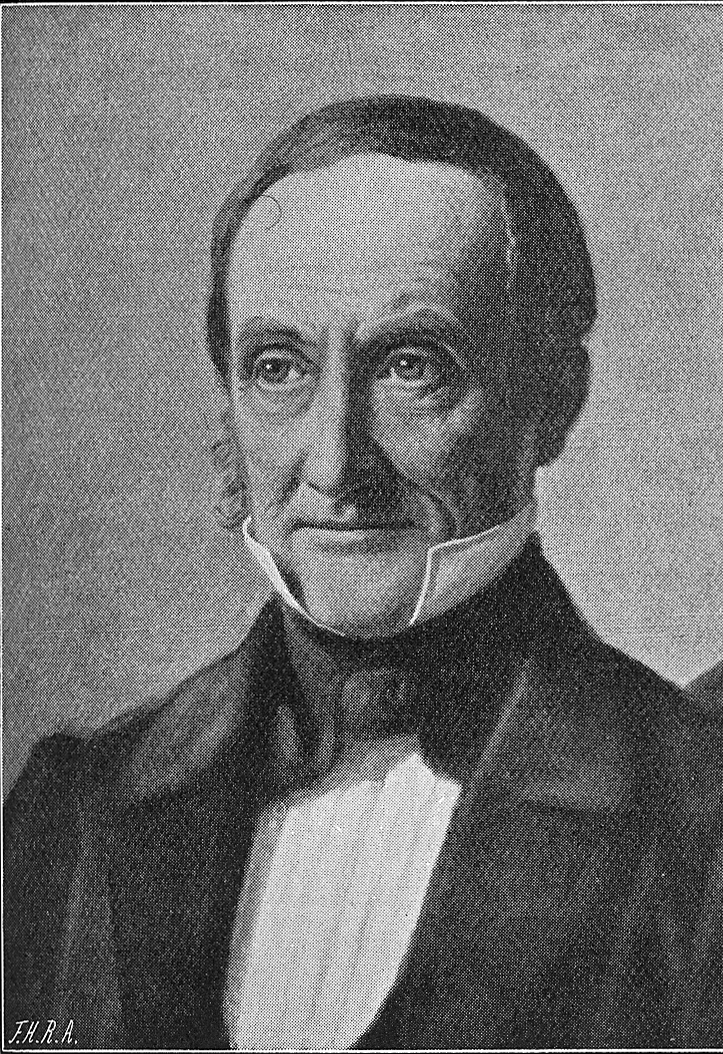
- Born: 25 October 1802; Randers, Denmark
- Died: 21 April 1882 (aged 79); Frederiksberg, Denmark
- Occupation: Jurist

Balthazar Matthias Christensen (25 October 1802 – 21 April 1882) was a Danish jurist and politician representing the Society of the Friends of Peasants (Danish: Bondevennernes Selskab).

Christensen was born in Randers, Denmark, in 1802 to master drafter and Major General Christian Peter Christensen (1765–1836) and Kirstine Bang (1772–1855). From 1829 to 1831 he was a government assistant on the Guinean coast, but in 1839 he returned to Denmark, where he founded a law firm in Copenhagen. The same year, he became editor of the newspaper Fædrelandet, but in 1841 he was censured and had to resign. From 1840 to 1843 he was a member of the Copenhagen City Council, the Frederiksberg Parish Council and the Copenhagen County Council. In 1846 he was a co-founder of the Society of the Friends of Peasants (Bondevennernes Selskab) and was its president from 1848 to 1958.

He was a member of the Folketing for long periods in 1849 to 1882, as well as for a short time in the Landstinget (1853–1866); from 1853–1880 he was State Auditor. As one of the leading figures of Venstre, he contributed to the formation of Carl Edvard Rotwitt's government in 1859. In 1866 he voted against the revised Constitution and in 1870 joined Det Forenede Venstre ('the United Left'). In his later years he had little political influence. From 1864 to 1867 he was a member of the parish council of Frederiksberg Municipality.

Christensen died in 1882 in Frederiksberg, Denmark, and is buried in Copenhagen.
