= Christopher Friedenreich Hage =

Danish merchant

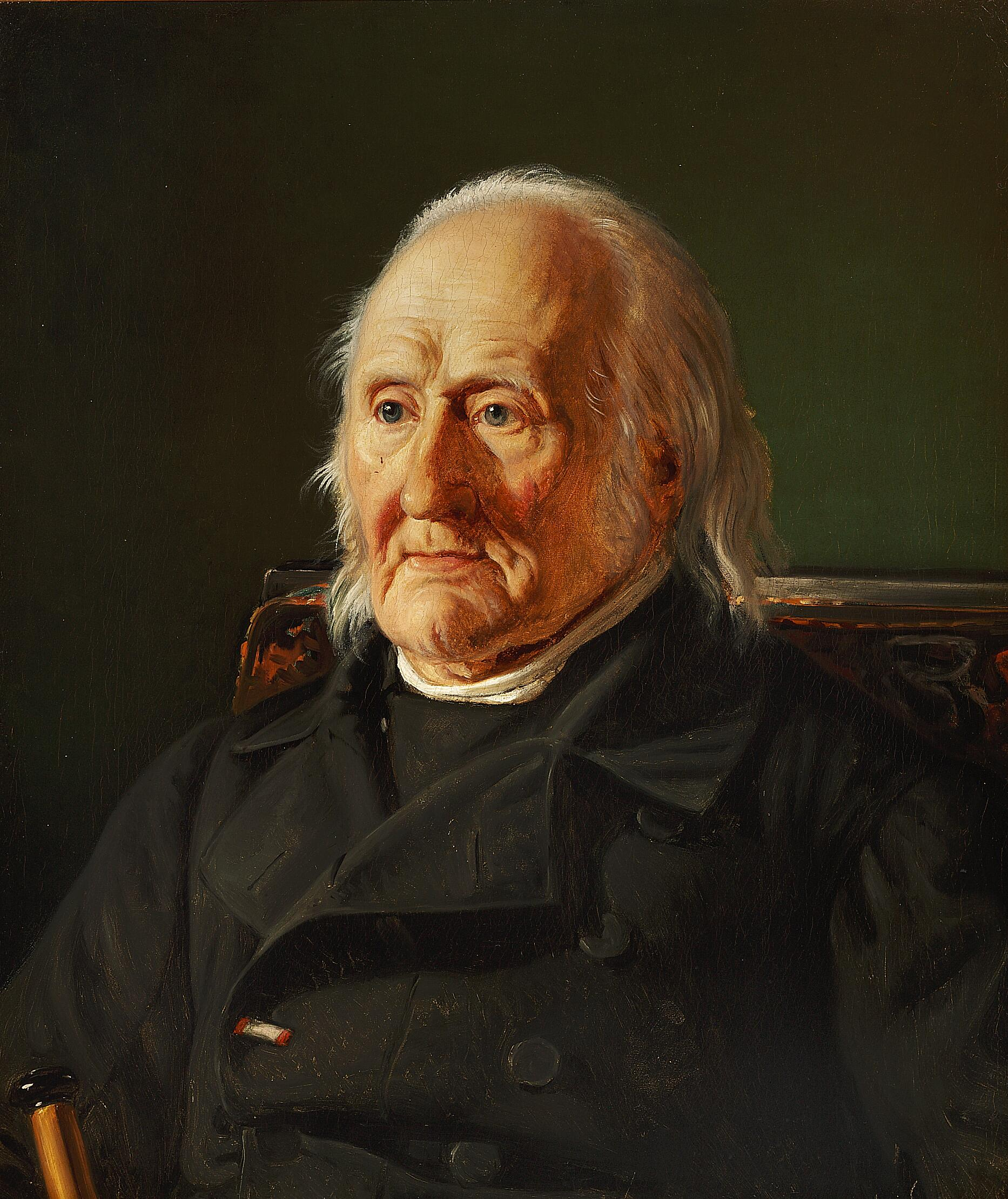
- Christopher Friedenreich Hage painted by Wilhelm Marstrand for his gold wedding
- Born: 19 July 1759; Stege, Denmark
- Died: 14 August 1849 (aged 90); Stege, Denmark
- Occupation: Merchant

Christopher Friedenreich Hage (19 July 1759 – 15 August 1849), was a Danish merchant on the island of Møn. He was the father of Alfred Hage, Hother Hage, Johannes Dam Hage and Bolette Hage.

== Early life and career ==
Hage was born in 1759, in Stege on Møn the son of Johannes Jensen Hage (1714-1791) and Bodil Margrethe Friedenreich (1729-1805). His family had been merchants on the island for many generations and he followed in his father's footsteps. Having acquired significant wealth, he built the Hage House in Stege in 1796. He was the younger brother of Jens Friedenreich Hage.

== Family ==
He married Arnette Christiane née Just. They had 10 children. His sons Alfred Hage and Christopher Theodor Friedenreich Hage (1819-1872) became successful merchants. His son Johannes Dam Hage contributed regularly to the newspaper Fædrelandet and was one of the leading initiators of the transformation of Denmark to a constitutional monarchy, as was his son Hother Hage.

His daughter Bolette Hage, a landscape painter, married the wealthy merchant Hans Puggaard.
