= Moderen =

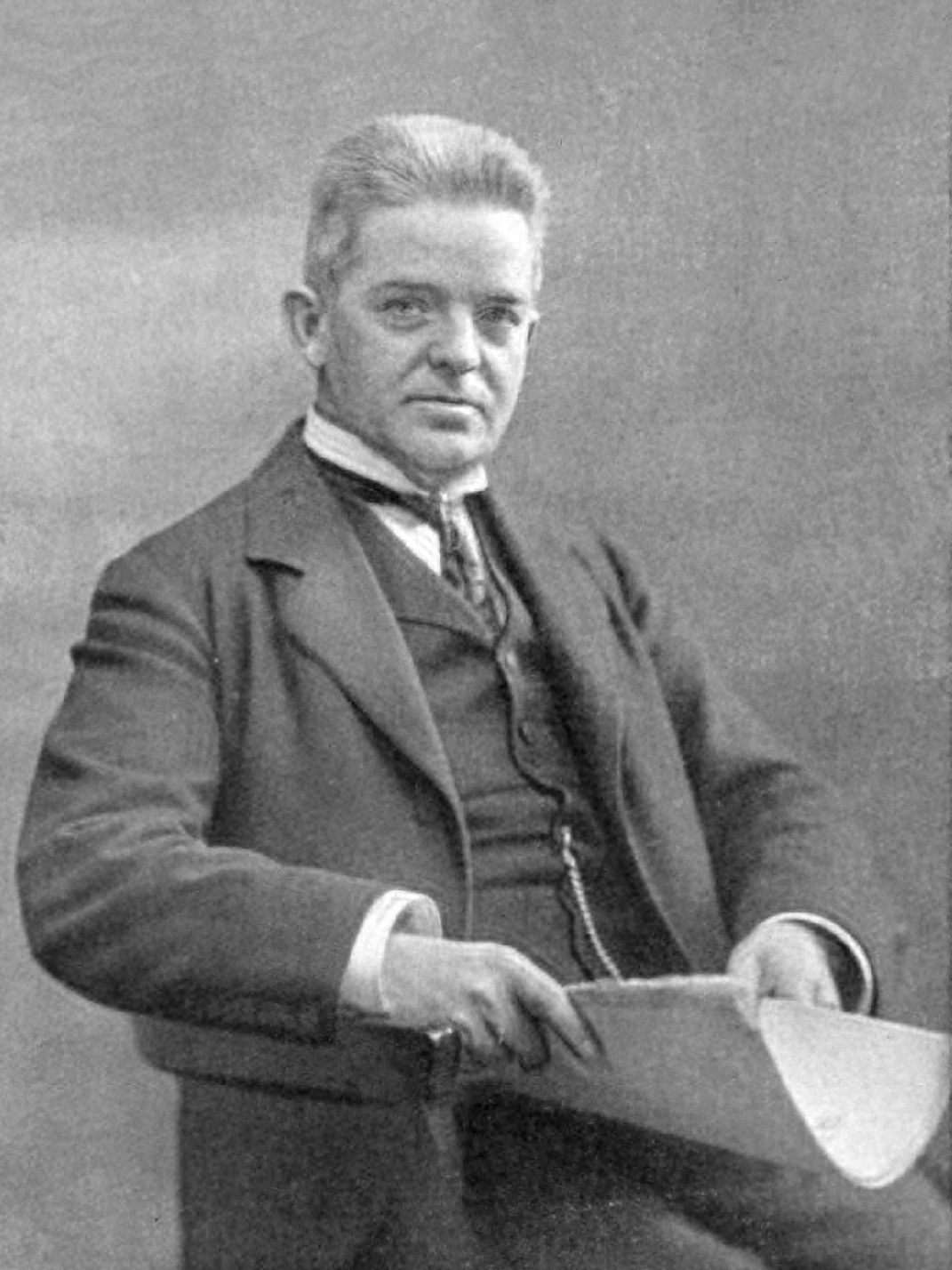
Carl Nielsen in 1917

Carl Nielsen's incidental music Moderen (The Mother), Opus 41, was written for a gala celebrating the reunification of Southern Jutland with Denmark. It was first performed on 30 January 1921 at the Royal Danish Theatre. The text was basically a collection of generally patriotic verses written by Helge Rode for the occasion.

== Background ==
Nielsen began to compose the music for the various songs in April 1920. The work proceeded rather slowly, partly because he was not too keen to be working for the theatre once more and partly because he was travelling on assignments in Paris, London and Amsterdam. In addition, he was already starting to work on his Fifth Symphony. Nevertheless, as time passed, he grew increasingly interested in the project. By the beginning of October, he was able to tell Johannes Nielsen, the theatre director, “It is a beautiful play, and I am interested in being part of it,” and inform Rode, “Your gala play has given me pleasure, so I want to do what I can with my music.”

The gala performance, originally scheduled for Boxing Day 1920, had to be postponed to January because the score was not completed in time for rehearsals. After considerable preparation, it finally took place on 30 January 1921. The accompanied songs assigned either to the Scald or to the Jester were sung by Svend Methling and Johannes Poulsen.

== Reception ==
While the reviews were not too enthusiastic about the production as a whole, most of them welcomed the music. Extrabladet praised "Carl Nielsen’s often magnificent music, clear and straightforward and with a rhythmic beauty of tone as it should be in a national gala play" while Gunnar Hauch commented in Theatret that Nielsen had succeeded in conveying a Danish tone, especially in the song about "Princess Tove of Denmark" which was "played upon strings that were so authentic".

== Music ==
Rode's play is a fairy-tale allegory about the return of a kidnapped son. The famous melody for flute and harp, Tågen letter (The Fog is Lifting), accompanies the first scene in which the King sees a mother parting from her son through the rising fog. The King instructs his Bard and his Fool to go out into the world and return in one year with joyful news. The Bard thinks of the beautiful Princess Tove, whose praises he sings in the light, spirited song, Min pige er så lys som rav (My girl is fair as amber), portraying her as a beautiful personification of Denmark. The Fool, however, expresses his cynicism in the song Dengang ørnen var flyveklar (The day the eagle was ready to fly). The music here is sharp, edgy, with occasional moments of dissonance, and its refrain snarls, "Strong is the eagle, broad are its wings: hatred is strongest!"

The fourth scene opens with a prelude: long, mournful cadences from the strings and muted wailing from the horns are permeated with unsettling melodic twists and turns. The Bard's song Så bitter var mit hjerte (So bitter was my heart), describes the lonely, frozen country around him and calls for the return of spring. When the West Wind responds, with great fanfare, by blowing down a wall of ice, the lost son appears. All return to the King's court, where they take part in a glorious procession, accompanied by Nielsen's beloved "March" with its fiery, patriotic spirit and its ceremonious yet joyous tone. People representing different regions of Denmark join in, symbolically welcoming mother and son. The entire company closes with the anthem-like song, Som en rejselysten flåde ("Like a venturous fleet at anchor").
