= Margrethe Vullum =

Danish-born Norwegian journalist, and proponent for women's rights

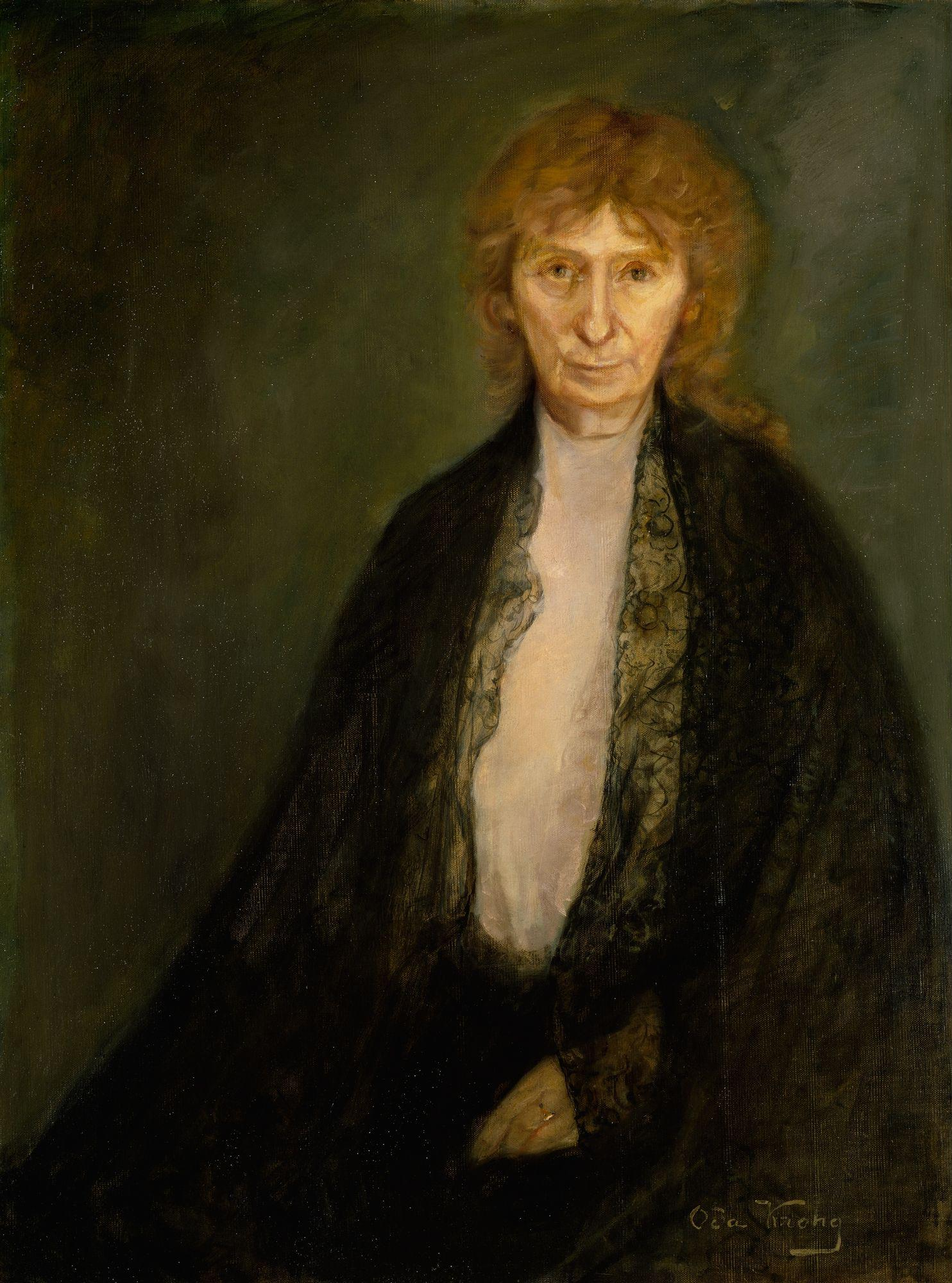
- Vullum portrayed by Oda Krohg
- Born: 14 February 1846; Copenhagen, Denmark
- Died: 14 August 1918 (aged 72)
- Occupation: Journalist

Margrethe Vullum (born Lehmann; first married name Rode; 14 February 1846 – 14 August 1918) was a Danish-born Norwegian journalist, literary critic and proponent for women's rights.

== Personal life ==
She was born in Copenhagen, a daughter of statesman Orla Lehmann and his artist wife Maria Puggaard, who had died young. She was thus a grand-daughter of the wealthy merchant and shipowner Hans Puggaard and his painter wife Bolette Puggaard. Her first marriage was with teacher and writer Gotfred Rode, with whom she had two sons, the politician Ove Rode and the writer Helge Rode. In 1879 she married journalist Erik Vullum.

== Career ==
Vullum settled in Norway in 1879, became a journalist for the newspaper Dagbladet, and later for Verdens Gang. She was a pioneering female voice in the public debates of the time. Among her contributions was a favorable review of the confiscated novel Albertine. Her interests gradually turned more into politics. She was among the principal speakers at the demonstrations in support of the Kristiania match workers' strike of 1889. She was among the founders of the Liberal Left Party in 1909.

A portrait of Vullum, painted by Oda Krohg, is located at the National Gallery of Norway.
