= Greyfriars Cemetery, Roskilde =

Cemetery in Roskilde, Denmark

Greyfriars Cemetery
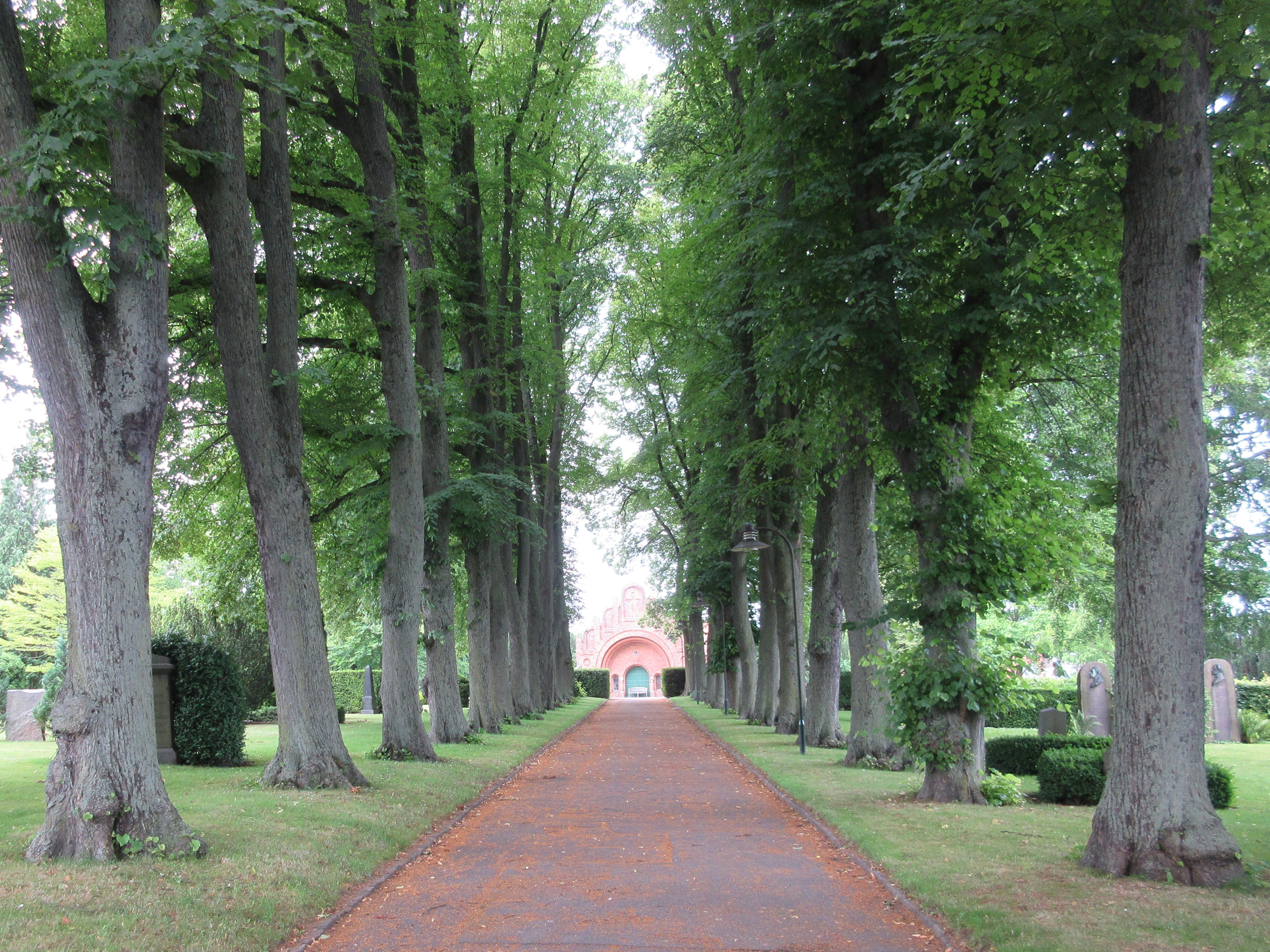
- Greyfriars Chapel
- Interactive map of Greyfriars Cemetery

Details
- Established: 13th century
- Location: Roskilde
- Country: Denmark
- Coordinates: 55°38′23″N 12°05′13″E
- Size: 22 ha (54 acres)
- Website: www.graabrodre-kirkegaard.dk

Greyfriars Cemetery (Danish: Gråbrødre Kirkegård) is located close to the Railway Station in central Roskilde, Denmark. It has a park-like setting. The cemetery's history as a burial site can be traced back to the middle of the 13th century. The current Greyfriars Chapel dates from the middle of the 19th century and was listed in 2010 together with the wall and entrance gate.

== History ==
The Franciscan friars came to Roskilde in 1237. In 1279, they inaugurated their chapel at the site where Greyfriars Chapel stands today. The friary was demolished after the Reformation, leaving only the chapel which was used as a parish church for the southern part of Roskilde. In 1625, it was partly demolished while the remainder was used as a burial chapel.

The cemetery was originally mainly used by the poor while more wealthy citizens were buried inside the cathedral or in the graveyard which surrounded it. In 1805, burials inside churches were prohibited by law and not much later the graveyard surrounding the cathedral also disappeared, leaving Greyfriars as Roskilde's principal burial site. In 1823, the cemetery was redesigned in the Romantic style.

== Buildings ==
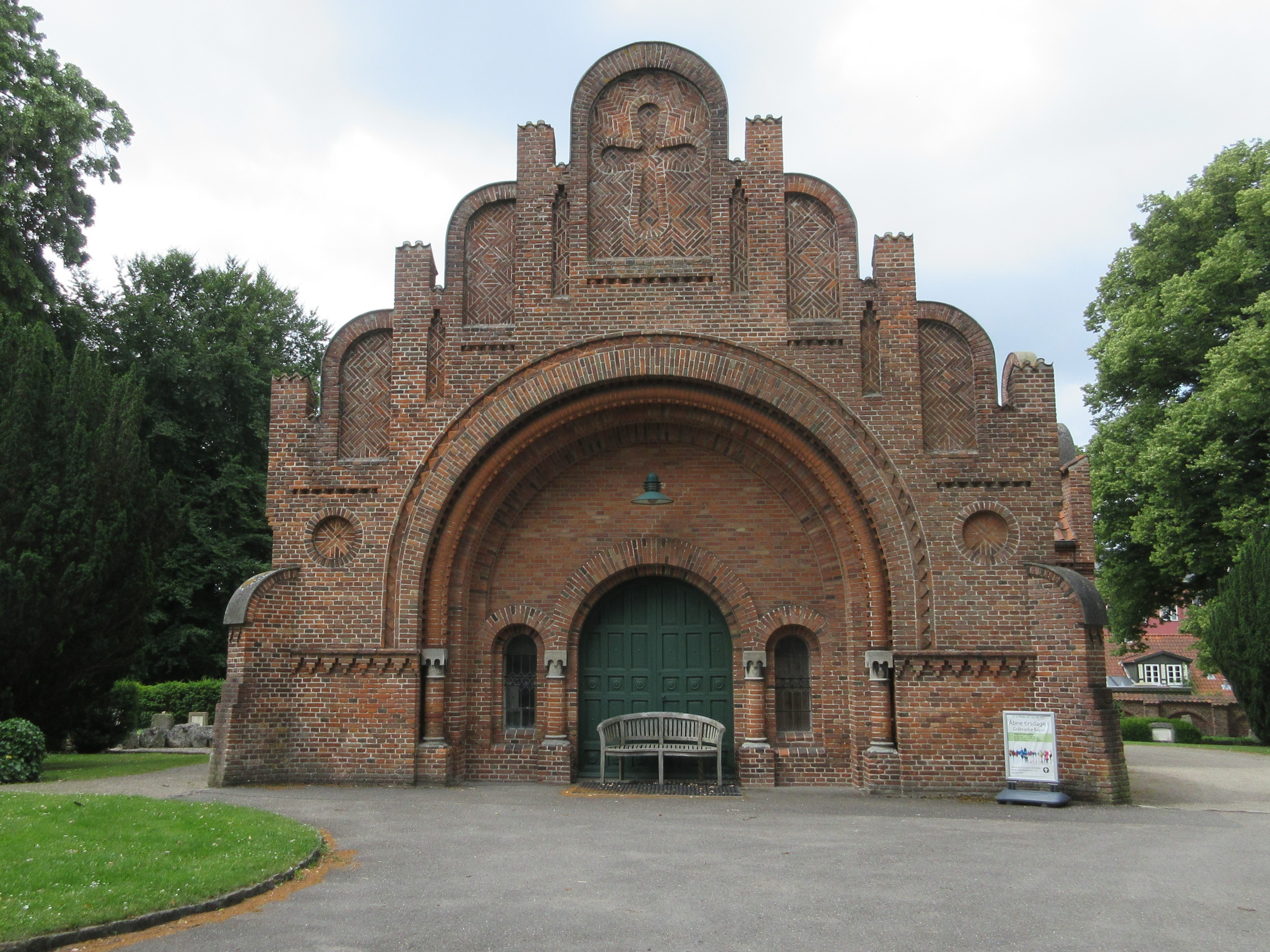
The chapel

The wall and entrance gate to the cemetery were built in 1853. The gate was designed by Henning Wolf, the wall by Ferdinand Meldahl. They collaborated on the design of Greyfriars Chapel which was completed in 1857 with inspiration from Venetian architecture. The chapel is an early example of the Historicist style which would dominate Danish architecture for the rest of the century. It is also notable for its decorative brickwork.

== Description ==
The cemetery has many fine trees. They include Weyse's Beech, a Weeping Beech located next to the entrance on Store Gråbrødrestræde, a maidenhair tree at the inspector's house and the more than 130-year-old lime tree avenue which links the Hestetorvet entrance to the chapel. The only entrance to the cemetery is through the gate from Store Gråbrødrestræde.

== Interments ==
- Christoph Ernst Friedrich Weyse (1774–1842), composer
- Gustav Wied (1858–1914), author
