= Carl Ploug =

Danish writer (1813–1894)

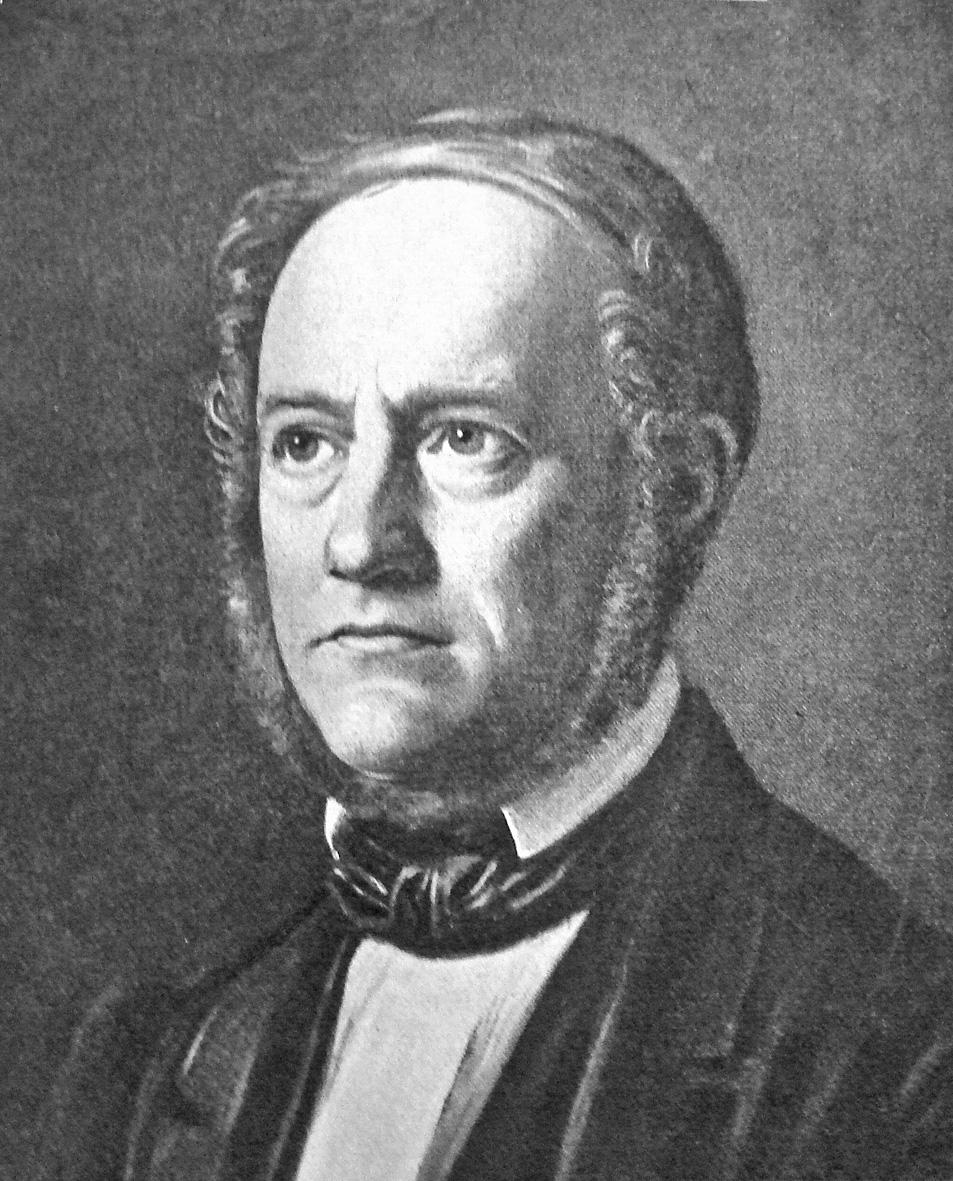
- Carl Ploug in 1912. Credit: Constantin Hansen
- Born: 29 October 1813; Kolding, Denmark
- Died: 27 October 1894 (aged 80); Copenhagen, Denmark
- Resting place: Vestre Cemetery
- Occupations: Journalist, writer, poet, politician
- Spouse: Frederikke Elisabeth Michelsen (m. 1854)

Carl Parmo Ploug (29 October 1813 – 27 October 1894) was a Danish poet, editor and politician.

Ploug was born in Kolding, Denmark, to assistant professor and future head instructor Christian Frederik Ploug (1774–1837) and Parmone Caroline née Petersen (1784–1860). On 6 July 1854 he married Frederikke Elisabeth née Michelsen (1834–1904) in Vartov Church. He graduated in 1829, after which he studied language and history.

In 1839 he became a contributor to the National Liberal magazine Fædrelandet. Ploug was a member of the Danish Constituent Assembly in 1848, where he belonged to Orla Lehmann and Henrik Nicolai Clausen's branch, which is usually referred to as the "left wing" of the National Liberal party. Ploug was a member of Folketinget from 1853 to 1857, and a member of Landstinget almost continuously from 1859 to 1890.

He gave the war of 1864 his warmest support, and he encouraged the people to fight, partly in the blind belief that Sweden would come to Denmark's military aid. The "brotherly people" did not, and the defeat of Austria-Prussia gave him a serious blow. When the National Liberals' proposal for a constitutional amendment was not adopted by Rigsrådet ('the Council of the Realm'), Ploug urged national unity to protect what remained of the fatherland, and therefore supported the conservative proposal, which was adopted as the Constitution of 1866.

As a young man, Ploug was strongly committed to personal freedom and advocated universal suffrage (for men), but over the years he went in a more conservative direction. For example, he was vehemently opposed to women's suffrage, and at the opening of the Landsting in 1888, his rejection of women's suffrage was adopted by 34 votes to 14. He suddenly fell ill on 27 October 1894, a few days before he was due to unveil the bust of Jens Christian Hostrup at the Regensen, and died the same day in Copenhagen.

== Life and work ==
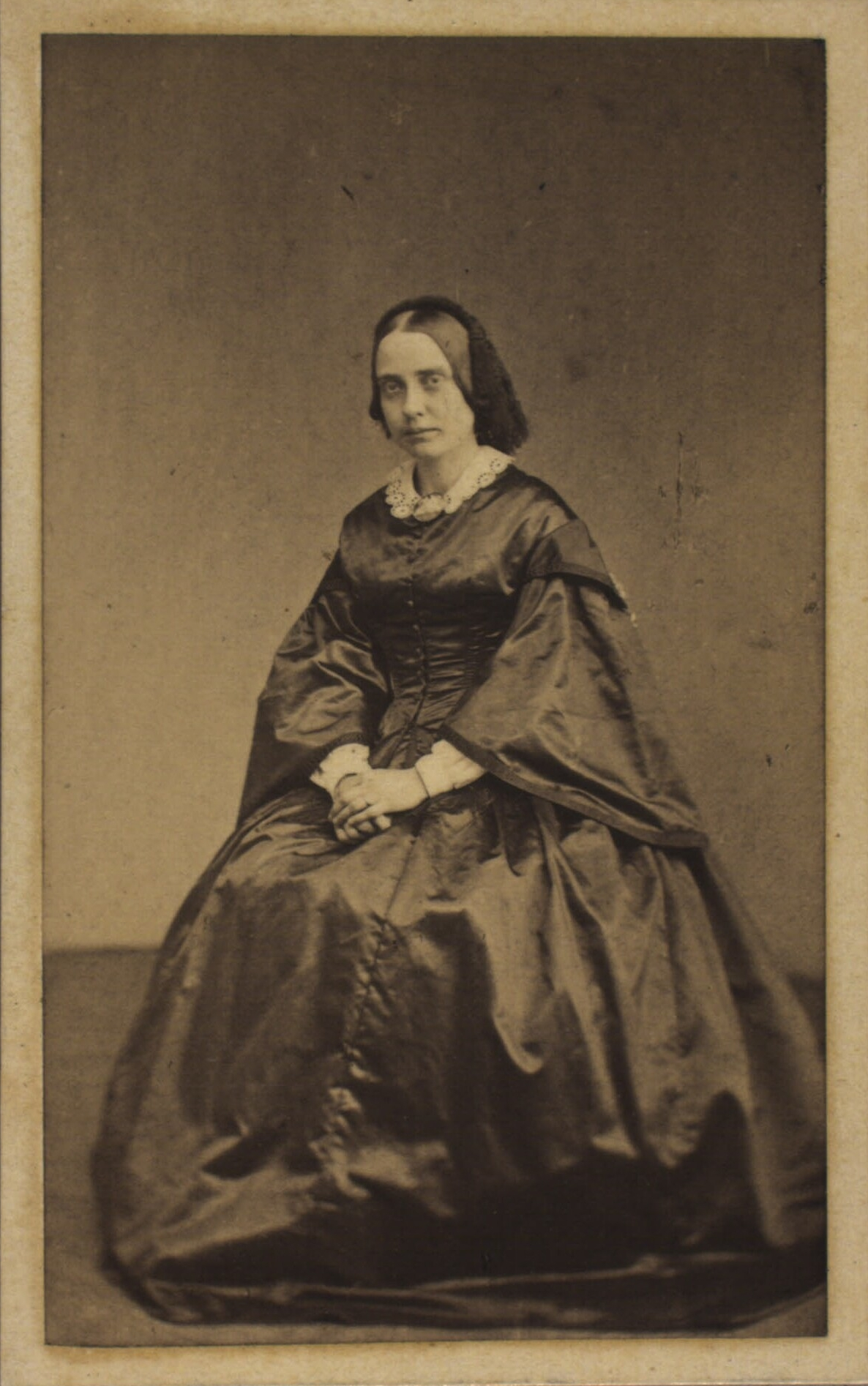
Wife Frederikke Elisabeth (1861). Credit: Rudolph Striegler

Ploug had three younger siblings. His poems reveal that he had a happy childhood. After graduating in 1829, he first studied theology and classical philology; however, he left his theology studies due to his dissatisfaction with Pietism. Ploug then opted for history and literature without obtaining a degree. He joined Fædrelandet on Orla Lehmann's recommendation and worked for a number of years as an uncompromising writer, committed to the fight against absolute monarchy and for Scandinavism, and a champion of Danishness and the preservation of the Danish language in Schleswig. He became editor of Fædrelandet in 1841 and held this post until 1881. During this long period he ran the magazine "almost exclusively".

Ploug, a great agitator, knew how to appeal to his audience's emotions. He exploited these talents, for example, in a speech to the Swedish Scandinavists in Kalmar in 1843, where he was greeted with cheers when he claimed that Southern Jutland was in danger of being conquered by "Germanness". Only a common Nordic nationality could stem this danger. On 22 June 1848, he published an article proposing the division of Schleswig along party lines, but received such overwhelming criticism and such a large drop in the magazine's subscriber base that he changed his mind, and in the years leading up to the war of 1864, he was one of the staunchest advocates of Ejderpolitik in his articles in Fædrelandet. In 1856, when Scandinavism experienced a revival, Ploug went back to Kalmar, where he spoke of the unification of the Nordic peoples, which would secure the Nordic countries a place in history. The means, according to Ploug, was for the childless Frederik VII to be succeeded by the Swedish crown prince. The plan was well received by the two royal houses, but the mutual assurances of brotherhood remained rhetorical and suffered final defeat when Sweden-Norway failed to support Denmark militarily during the Second Schleswig War. Ploug's uncompromising approach meant that even in the "golden age" of national liberalism from 1855 to 1863, he found himself at odds with leading politicians. Even his close friend Lehmann, who was Minister of the Interior in Carl Christian Hall's government from 1861 to 1863, briefly antagonized him, and Ploug criticised this government for being unclear in its defence of the Ejderpolitik.

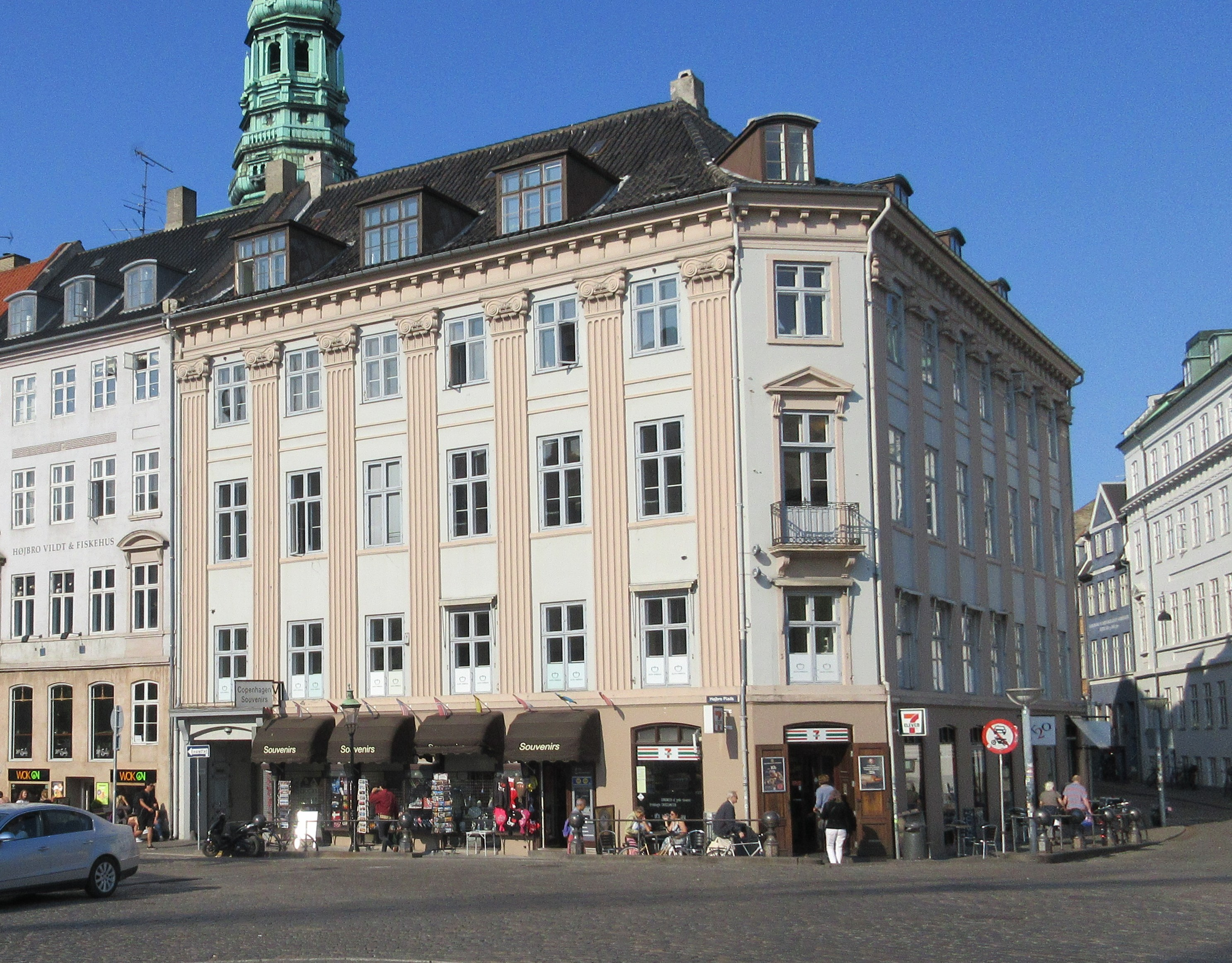
The Ploug House at Højbro Plads 21 in Copenhagen.

Inn circa 1862, Ploug purchased the large building on Højbrø Plads, from then on known as the Ploug House, from his friend Moritz G. Melchior. He also started publishing Fædrelandet from the building. During the Second Schleswig War, Ploug sought to stir up the national spirit with agitational messages in Fædrelandet. He blamed the defeat at the Battle of Als and the ceding of the duchies on Christian IX. He also sought, when defeat was a fact, to revive the Scandinavian idea of union, but the Swedish "allies" did not want to be involved in a struggle for the reconquest of Schleswig. After the defeat, the National Liberal leaders moved to the right in Danish politics, and Ploug was elected to several positions of trust in the party Højre. In the years leading up to his death, he emerged as one of the extreme conservatives, in part because of his opposition to women's suffrage. When he was attacked for his change of position, he defended himself by saying that it was the surroundings that had changed. He himself felt that he was true to his ideals. He succeeded, along with Carl Christian Hall, to influence Højre in a romantic nationalist direction, although the party maintained its support for the king.

== Poetry ==
Ploug wrote poetry throughout most of his life, mostly occasional poems for national celebrations, memorial poems and love poems, but also narrative poems. He was active at student gatherings and at the folk festivals on Skamlingsbanken, for which he also wrote a number of songs playing on national sentiment. In 1842 he wrote "Længe var Nordens herlige Stamme", which in the following years became a kind of battle song for Scandinavianism. Impressed by the Danish evacuation of Danevirke in 1848, he wrote "Den danske sang: Liflig fløjte Velsklands Nattergale". He also wrote the song "Vaj højt, vaj stolt og frit vort flag", which was a symbol of Danish nationalism during World War II. Ploug had a private emotional life. Until he married Frederikke Elisabeth Michelsen in 1854, he did not write songs about love and eroticism. Later he wrote several sonnets that are unequivocal declarations of love for his wife, including the poem "Fra hjemmet III", which he wrote for her birthday in 1883.

== Reception and legacy ==
As the penman of the National Liberals, he was for better or worse identified with this movement, and therefore, after the defeat in the Second Schleswig War, severely reviled for his "unrealistic" agitation during the war. In the 1870s he was severely reviled by Edvard Brandes for his support of the conservative forces. It has been pointed out that his "national romantic fantasies" made it difficult for politicians to take more level-headed decisions during this war. In Ploug's defence, it has been emphasized that he never took personal advantage of his views, just as his contributions to Fædrelandet took no account of friend or foe. He wrote solely from his convictions.

Ploug was awarded the Constitution Medal in gold in 1855. In 1872, he was created a Knight in the Order of the Dannebrog. In 1874, he was awarded the Cross of Honour. In 1888, he was created a second-class commander in the Order of the Dannebrog.

Carl Ploug's gravestone in Vestre Cemetery features a portrait relief of him by Wilhelm Bissen.

Various streets in Denmark, such as Carl Plougs Vej in Frederiksberg, and Carl Plougs Veg in Aarhus, are named after him. In a small garden complex at the corner of Carl Plougs Vej and Danasvej stands a bust of Carl Ploug. The bust was also created by Vilhelm Plessen. It was originally placed outside the Student Association's building on H. C. Andersens Boulevard but was moved to its current location in 1972. An inscription on the plinth reads:

Han stod ved roer, når vi styred mod Norden
Han var vor Thor, når vi trængte til torden
Han blæste i luren, når vægterne sov
Kjender I så, Carl Ploug

Translation:

He stood by the rudder when we steered North
He was our Thor when we needed magic
He blew the lur when the watchmen were asleep
You now know him, Carl Ploug

Carl Plougsvej in the southern part of Kolding is also named after Carl Ploug. Ploug is also commemorated by a memorial at Koldinghus. The memorial was created by Carl Martin-Hansen and installed in 1899.

Vilhelm Bissen's father, Herman Wilhelm Bissen, has also created a bust of Ploug (marble, 1857). It is now in the collection of in the Nivaagaard Museum north of Copenhagen.

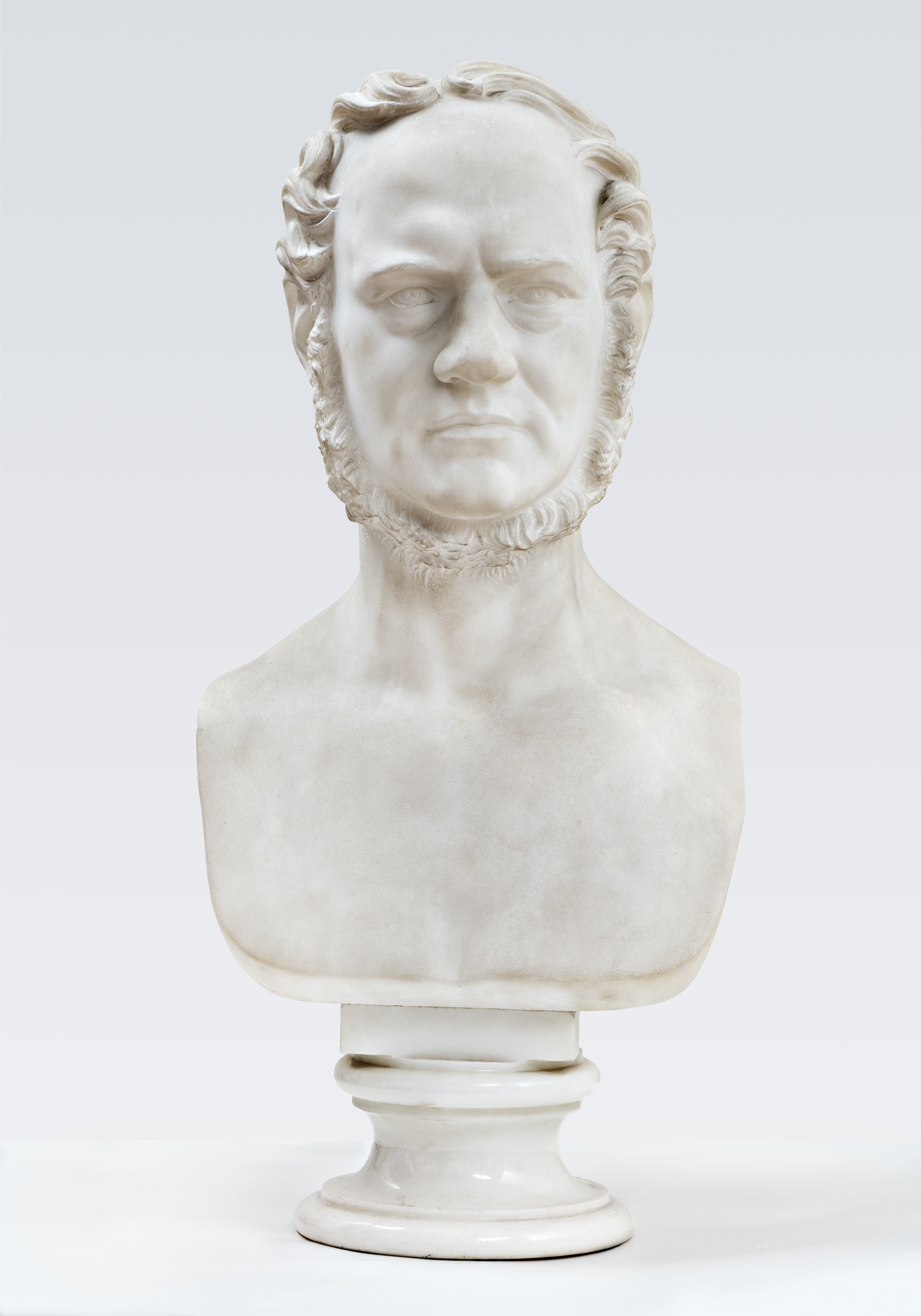
Bust by Herman Wilhelm Bissen in the Nivaagaard painting collection

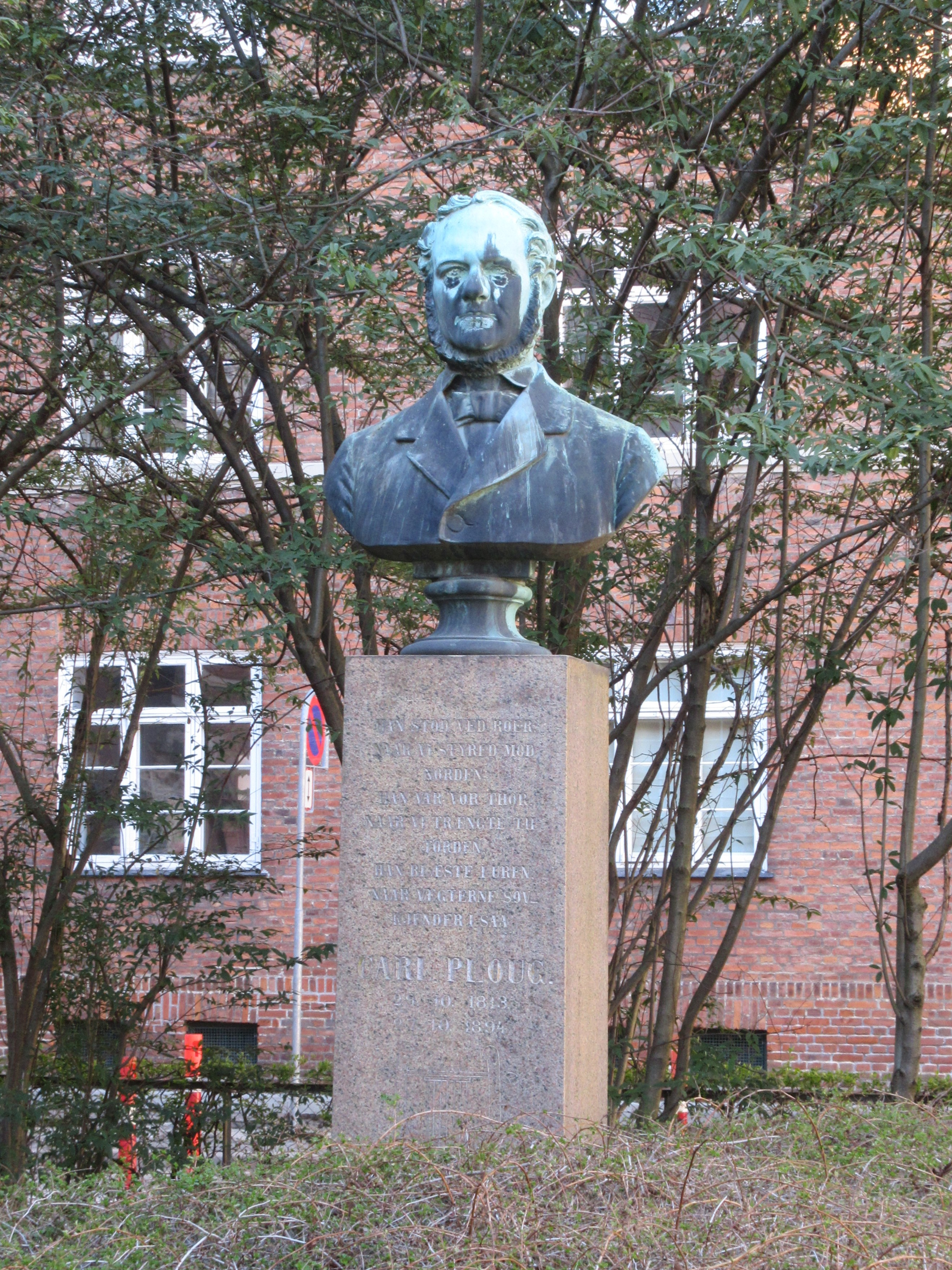
Bust at Danas Plads

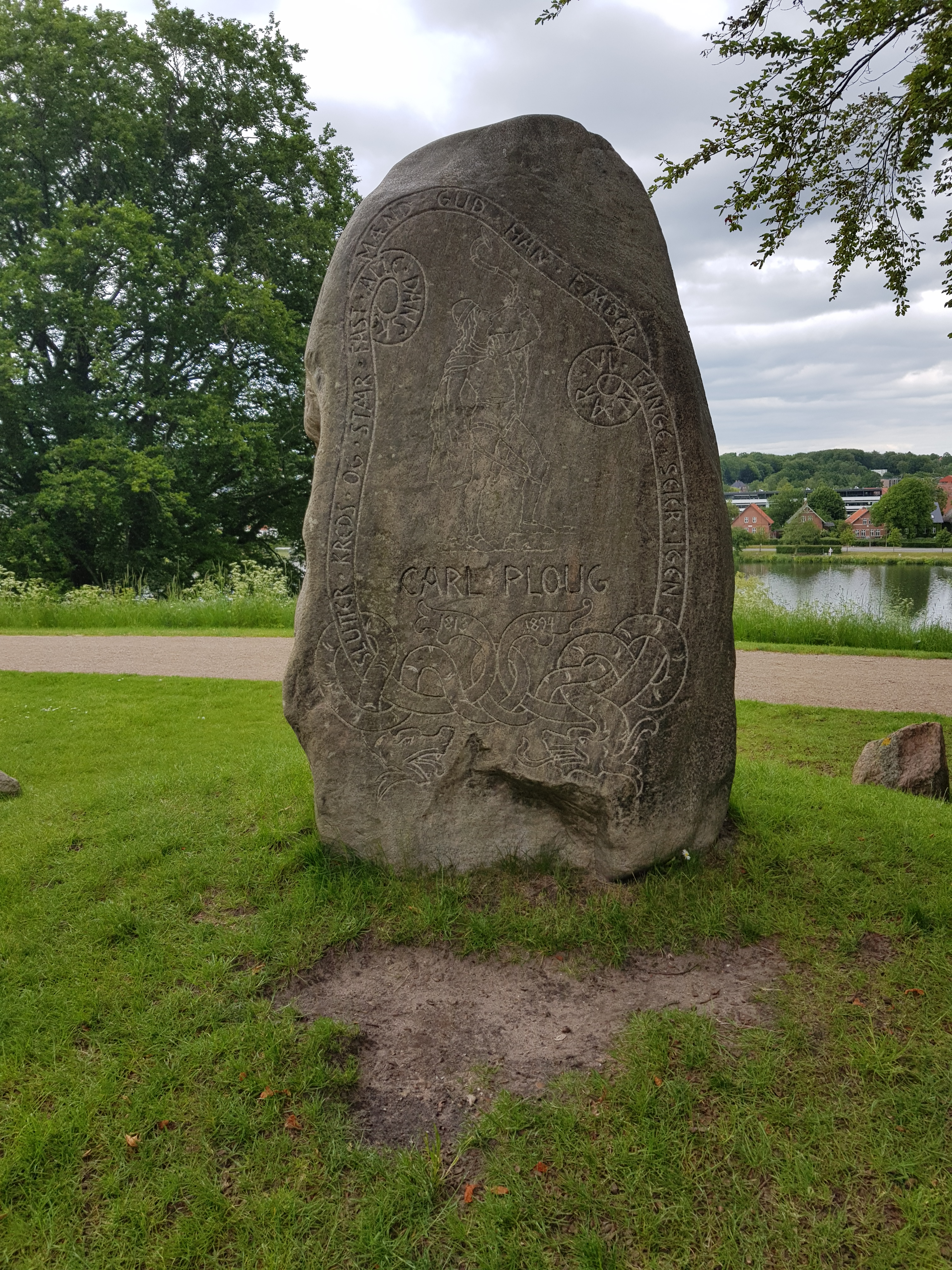
Memorial at Koldinghus
