= Henrik Nicolai Clausen =

Danish theologian and politician

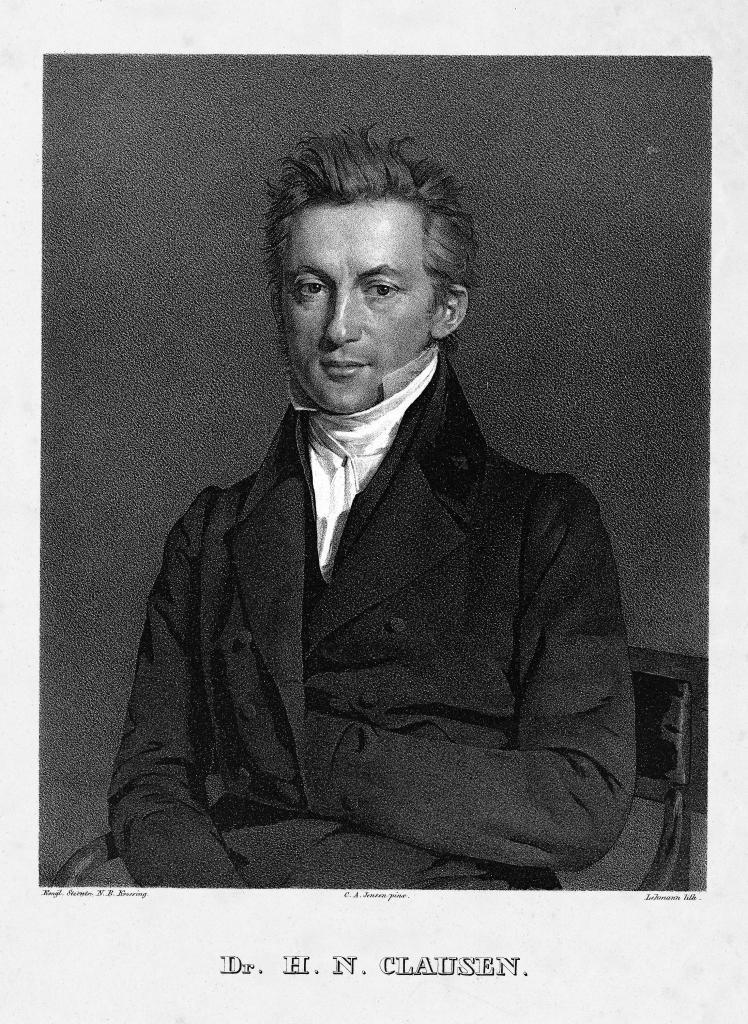
Henrik Nicolai Clausen, lithography from 1837, after painting by Christian Albrecht Jensen.

Henrik Nicolai Clausen (22 April 1793 – 28 March 1877) was a Danish theologian and national liberal politician. He was a member of the National Constitutional Assembly from 1848 to 1849, of the Folketing from 1849 to 1853 and of the Landsting from 1853 to 1863.

== Early life and education ==
Henrik Nicolai Clausen was born on the island of Lolland, the son of resident chaplin and later provost H. G. Clausen (1759–1840) and Sophia M. Schiern (1769–1817). He was the elder brother of theologian Emil Theodor Clausen (1802–1851). The family moved to Copenhagen when he was four years old. He graduated from the Metropolitan School in 1809.

Clausen became a student in 1809 and a candidate in theology in 1813. He won the university's gold medal for Fremstilling og Bedømmelse af Apologeternes Beviser for Kristendommen imod hedenske og jødiske Modstandere in 1815. and became a doctor of philosophy in 1817.

== Career ==
From 1820 he held a professorial chair in theology at the University of Copenhagen where his theological rationalism influenced Magnús Eiríksson and was one of the instructors of Søren Kierkegaard .

He wrote, besides other works, Romanism and Protestantism (1825); Popular Discourses on the Reformation (1836); a commentary on the synoptical Gospels, and Christian Dogmatics (1867).

In 1840 he was chosen a deputy to the States, and near the end of 1848 was appointed a member of the Moltke II Cabinet. He was a member of the National Constitutional Assembly from 1848 to 1849, of the Folketing from 1849 to 1853 and of the Landsting from 1853 to 1863.

== Personal life ==
Clausen married on 8 December 1821 in the Church of Our Lady in Copenhagen Birgitte Francisca Swane (1797-1875), daughter of brewer and timber merchant Hans Swane (1753–1803) and Johanne Marie Gad (1767–1842). They were the parents of the theologian Johannes Clausen (1830-1905).

He died on 27 March 1877 and is buried in Copenhagen's Assistens Cemetery.

== Awards and commemoration ==
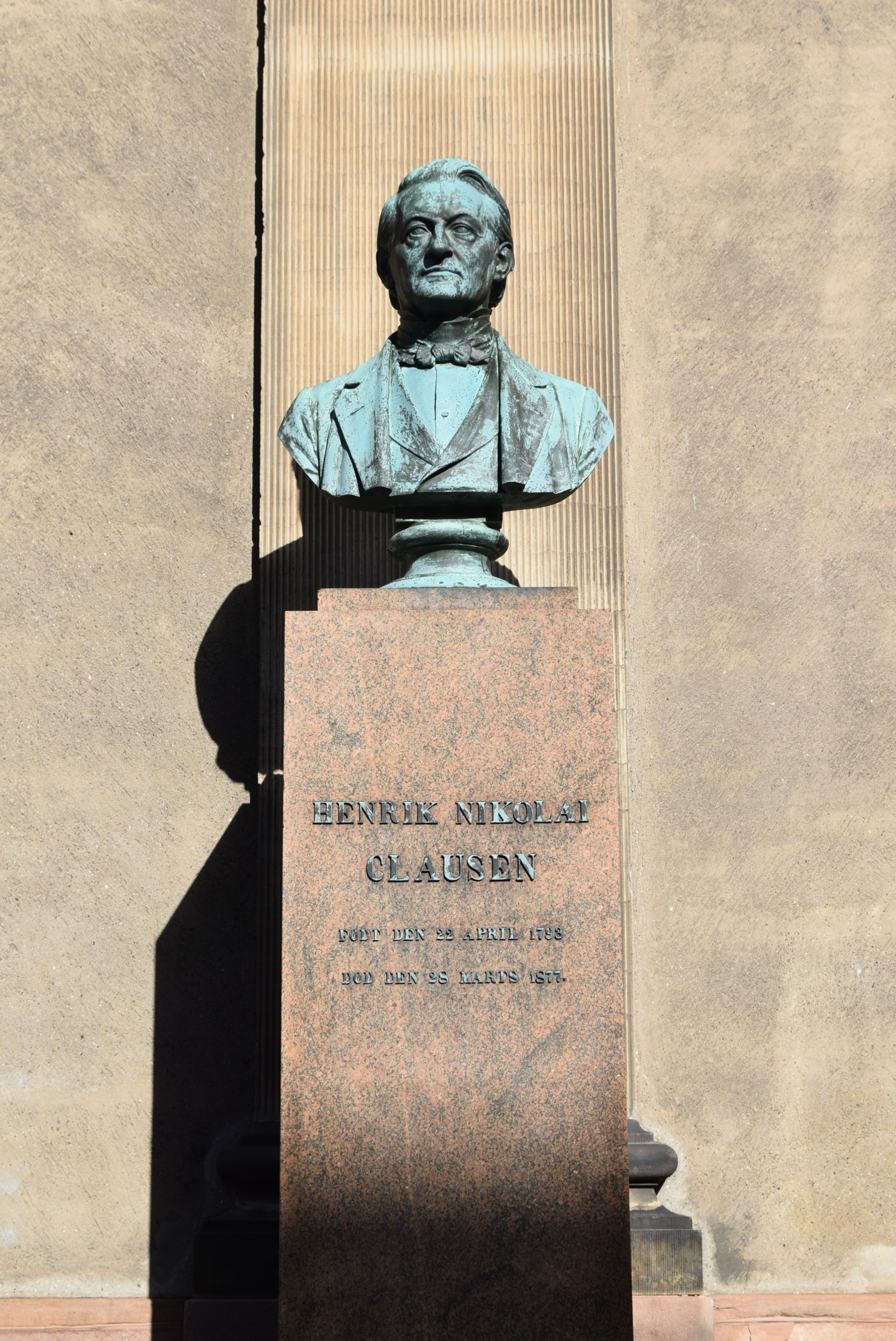
Bust of Clausen on Frue Plads in Copenhagen.

Clausen was created a Knight in the Order of the Dannebrog in 1836 and a Commander of the Order of the Dannebrog in 1850. He was awarded the Cross of Honour in 1869 and the Grand Cross in 1871.

A portrait painting of him by C. A. Jensen (1827) and another one by Wilhelm Marstrand are in the collection of the Museum of National History at Frederiksborg Castle in Hillerød. He is also depicted on Constantin Hansen's group portrait painting of The Danish Constituent Assembly (Christiansborg Palace). Herman Wilhelm Bissen (1858, Danish National Gallery) and Theobald Stein (1865) have both created portrait busts of him. An enlarged version of Bissen's portrait bust created by his son Vilhelm Bissen was installed in front of the University of Copenhagen on Frue Plads in 1878.

H. N. Clausens Gade in Aarhus is named after him.
