= Helge Rode =

Danish writer, critic and journalist (1870–1937)

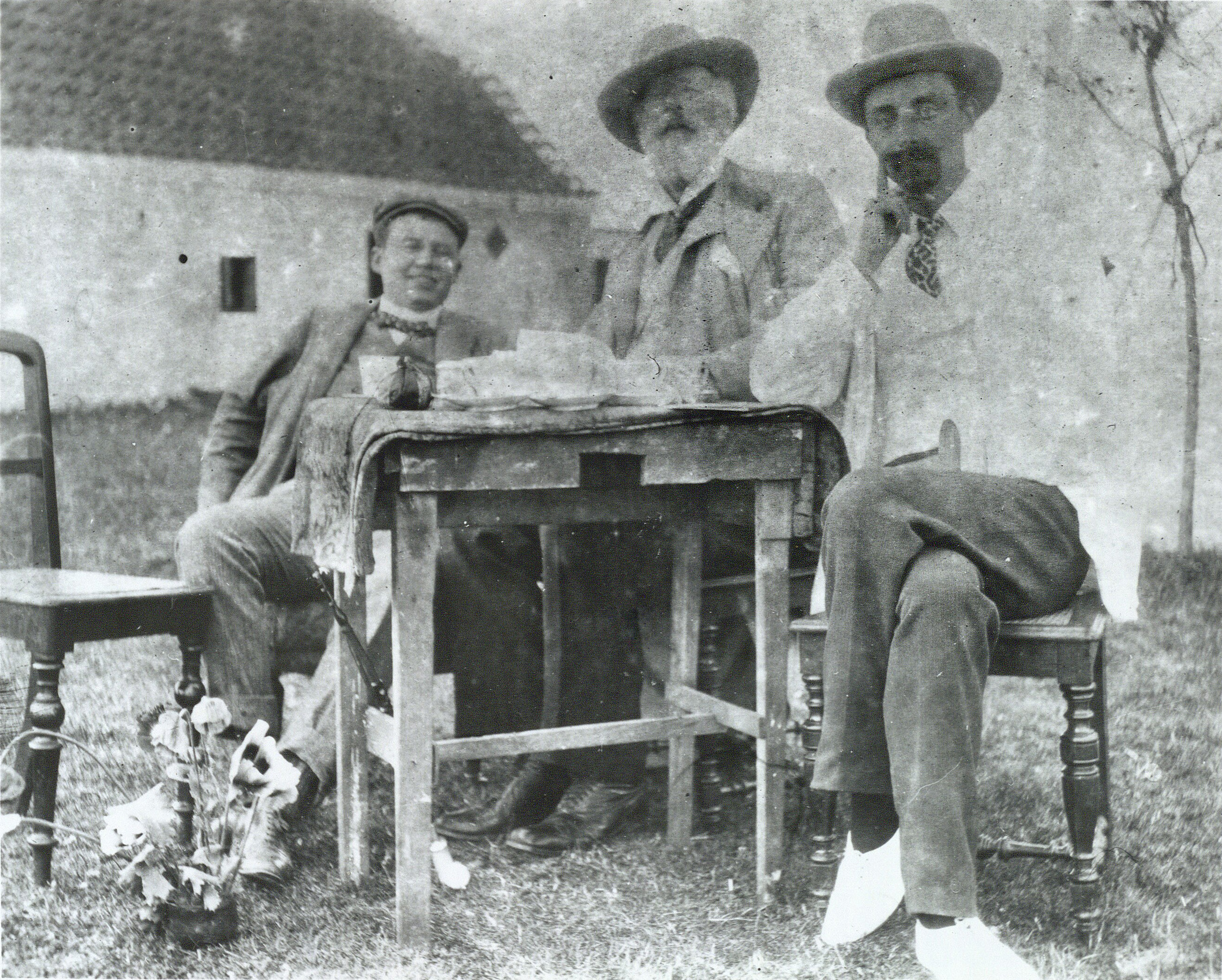
Authors Holger Drachmann (middle) and Helge Rode (right) in Skagen, c. 1905.

Helge Rode (16 October 1870 – 23 March 1937) was a Danish writer and critic, and journalist for Politiken, Berlingske Tidende, and Illustreret Tidende. He was born in Frederiksberg, a son of Margrethe Rode, the brother of politician Ove Rode, and father of actor Ebbe Rode. In 1905, he married the writer Edith Rode, with whom he had four children.

He was a critic of Georg Brandes and the Modern Breakthrough. Composer Carl Nielsen's piece Moderen (The Mother) was written for a play by Rode in 1920–1921.
