= Fædrelandet (1834–1882) =

Danish newspaper

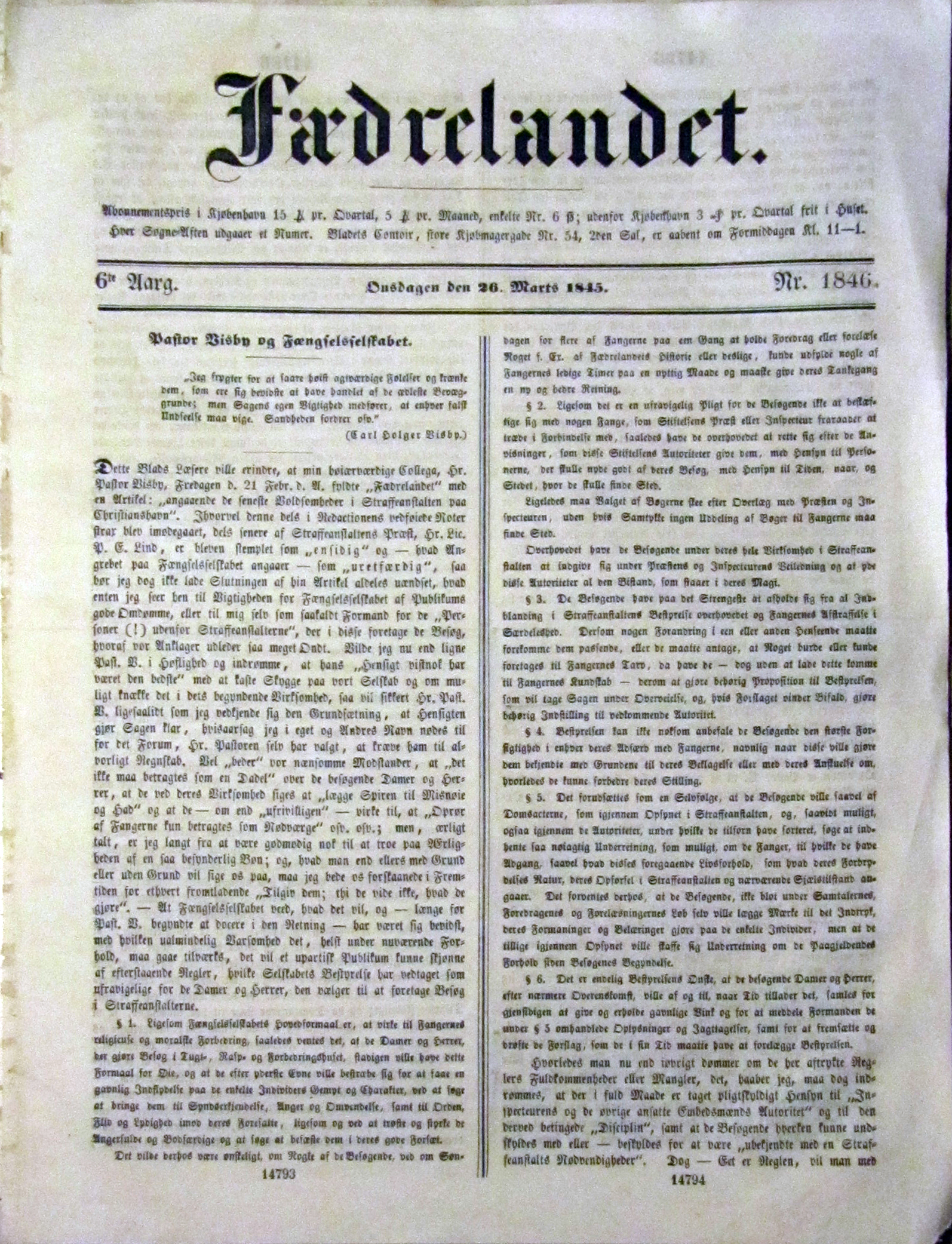
- Front page from 1845
- Type: Daily newspaper (1839–1882)
- Founded: 1734; 291 years ago
- Political alignment: National liberal (1834–1869), Conservative (1870–1882)
- Language: Danish
- Headquarters: Ploug House, Copenhagen, Denmark
- Circulation: c. 2,000

Fædrelandet was a National Liberal Danish newspaper published from 1834 to 1882 in Copenhagen, Denmark. It played a central role in the fight for a free constitution in the 1840s.

== History ==
Fædrelandet was established as a weekly journal by Christian Georg Nathan David and Johannes Dam Hage (1800–1837) in 1834.

On 1 January 1839, it was relaunched as a daily newspaper. At the same time, David was succeeded by Balthazar Christensen as editor-in-chief. On 1 January 1840, Christensen was succeeded by Ditlev Gothard Monrad. Orla Lehmann took over the position on 28 March 1841 but was replaced by Carl Ploug after being placed under censorship. Ploug published it from the Ploug House on Højbro Plads.

Fædrelandet came to play a key role during the March Days of 1848.

The newspaper remained the most important opinion-forming newspaper in the country until 1864. After Denmark's devastating defeat in the Second Schleswig War, it was in opposition to Venstre, politically as well as literally, explicitly supporting Højre from 1870. The art historian Julius Lange (1838–1896) was an art critic for the newspaper.

Antonio Leigh-Smith succeeded Ploug as editor-in-chief in 1881 but the newspaper closed the following year.

== Editors-in-chief ==
- Christian Georg Nathan David (1834–1839)
- Johannes Dam Hage (4 September 1835 – 1 July 1837)
- Balthazar Christensen (7 December 1839 – 1841)
- Ditlev Gothard Monrad (1 January 1840 – 1841)
- Orla Lehmann (28 March 1841)
- Carl Ploug and Jens Giødwad (12 May 1841 – 1881)
- Antonio Leigh-Smith (1881–1882)
