= Orla Lehmann =

Danish politician (1810–1870)

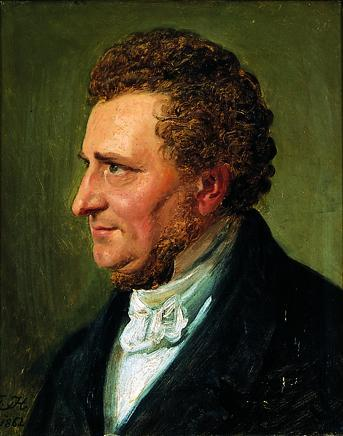
- Portrait of Orla Lehmann painted by Constantin Hansen, 1862

Minister of the Interior (Denmark)
- In office 15 September 1861 – 31 December 1863
- Prime Minister: Carl Christian Hall
- Preceded by: Ditlev Gothard Monrad
- Succeeded by: Carl von Nutzhorn

Personal details
- Born: Peter Martin Orla Lehmann; May 15, 1810 Copenhagen, Denmark
- Died: September 13, 1870 (aged 60) Copenhagen, Denmark
- Resting place: Holmen Cemetery
- Party: National Liberal Party
- Children: Margrethe Vullum
- Education: University of Copenhagen

Peter Martin Orla Lehmann (15 May 1810 – 13 September 1870) was a Danish statesman, a key figure in the development of Denmark's parliamentary government.

== Early life and education ==
He was born in Copenhagen, son of Martin Christian Gottlieb Lehmann (1775–1856), assessor, later conference councillor (konferensraad) and deputy in the College of Commerce. His father was German, born in Haselau at Uetersen in Holstein, while his mother was Danish and the daughter of a mayor in Copenhagen. The family belonged to the same social circle as the Ørsted brothers and the poet Oehlenschläger. Orla was put in the German realschule in the St. Petri parish, later moved to the Borgerdydskole and began his studies at the University of Copenhagen in 1827. After a year studying literature, when he read Heine in the company of Hans Christian Andersen, he began his studies in law. After a study program which he found tedious, he graduated in 1833.

== Political career ==
Although of German extraction, Orla Lehmann's sympathies were with the Danish National Liberal Party. and he contributed to the liberal journal Kjøbenhavnsposten while he was a student, and from 1839 to 1842 edited, with Christian N. David, Fædrelandet. In 1842 he was condemned to three months imprisonment for a radical speech. He took a considerable part in the demonstrations of 1848, and was regarded as the leader of the Eider-Danes, that is, of the party which regarded the Eider River as the boundary of Denmark, and the Duchy of Schleswig as an integral part of the kingdom. He was one of the main authors of the Danish liberal Constitution of 1848.

He entered the Cabinet of Moltke I in March 1848, and was employed on diplomatic missions to London and Berlin in connection with the Schleswig-Holstein Question but left the cabinet the same year because of his dissatisfaction with the political situation. As a local official in Jutland he was for some months in 1849 a prisoner of the Schleswig-Holsteiners at Gottorp. A member of the Folketing from 1851 to 1853, of the Landsting from 1854 to 1870, and from 1856 to 1866 of the Rigsråd, he became Minister of the Interior in 1861 in the cabinet of K. C. Hall, retiring with him in 1863.

During these years he was overshadowed by the younger National Liberals especially by Hall, however, he in many ways did great work behind the scenes, for instance, it was he who carried through the law of women's economic independence. His last years were embittered by the defeat of 1864 and by his presentiment of the new German great power. He died in Copenhagen in September 1870.

Being a speaker of early Danish parliamentarian life (almost like Lamartine in France), Lehmann, seems to have lacked some sense of reality. As "the freedom fighter of 1848", he remained a national hero in Denmark for several generations.

== Legacy ==
Lehmann's book On the Causes of the Misfortunes of Denmark (1864) were published in several editions, and a collection of his works were published posthumously in four volumes.

Lehmann married Maria Puggaard (1821–1849), the daughter of Hans Puggaard, who died young. His only daughter, Margrethe Rode, later Vullum (1846–1918) was a journalist and literary critic. His two grandsons were the politician Ove Rode and the author Helge Rode.

Political offices
Preceded by —	Minister without Portfolio of Denmark; 22 March 1848 – 15 November 1848	Succeeded by Henrik Nicolai Clausen
Preceded by Ditlev Gothard Monrad	Interior Minister of Denmark; 15 September 1861 – 31 December 1863	Succeeded by Carl Ludvig Vilhelm Rømer von Nutzhorn
