= John Christmas =

John Christmas may refer to:

- John Christmas (sea captain) (1753–1822), English-born Danish sea captain
- John Christmas (1799–1873), Danish naval officer, son of the above, and governor general of the Danish West Indies in 1871
- John Christmas (banker) (born 1969), United States banker and head of the Latvian Parex Bank's International Relations in the early 2000s
- John Christmas Beckwith (1759–1809), English organist and composer
- John Christmas Møller (1894–1948), Danish politician, leader of The Conservative People's Party between 1928 and 1947
- Johnny Christmas (born 1982), American lacrosse player

== See also ==
- Finding John Christmas, 2003 American film directed by Andy Wolk
