= John Christmas (naval officer) =

Royal Danish Navy officer and colonial administrator

Portrait of Christmas

Counter-Admiral John Christmas (3 February 1799 – 3 November 1873) was a Royal Danish Navy officer and colonial administrator who served as the Governor-General of the Danish West Indies in 1871. Born in Copenhagen, he settled as a plantation owner on Saint Croix in the Danish West Indies. He was the paternal grandfather of writer Walter Christmas.

== Early life ==
Christmas was born on 3 February 1799 in Copenhagen, the son of ship captain and general trader John Christmas and Johanne Maria Heinrich (1771–1808). His parents were divorced in 1803. His maternal grandfather was Johan Friedrich Heinrich.

== Career ==
Christmas became a cadet in 1813, a junior lieutenant in 1820, a senior lieutenant in 1827, captain lieutenant in 1840, captain in 1847 and commodore in 1852.

In 1821–22, he was with the corvette Diana in the Danish West Indies.

In 1823–28, on leave from the navy, he sailed in the West Indies trade as captain of Dunzfelt & Co.'s frigate Henriette Louise. In 1835–42, he was captain of the bargue Johanne Marie, which he himself owned, in the West Indies,

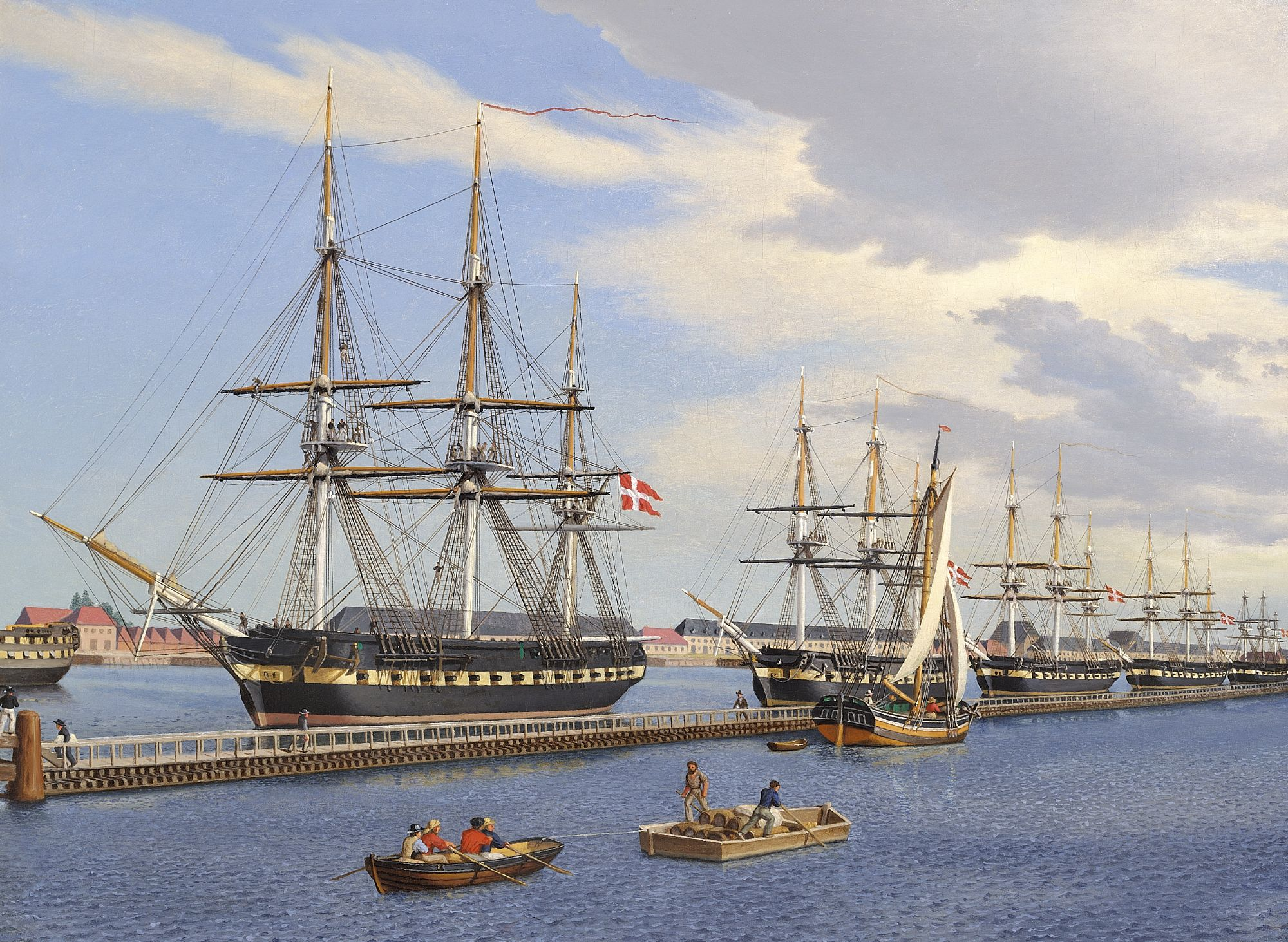
C. W. Eckersberg: Gefion, Thetis, Bellona, Havfruen and Rota. in Copenhagen, 1849.

In 1843–45, he was back in naval service, as captain of Mercurius, first in the Danish West Indies and then as part of the Mediterranean squadron under H. G. Garde. In the years 1845–48, he undertook several trips to the West Indies. During the First Schleswig War, in 1848, he was commander of first Freja and then Havfruen (18 August 1848 – 14 October 1848) in the North Sea squadron, and in 1849 commander of the frigate Rota.

== In the Danish West Indies ==
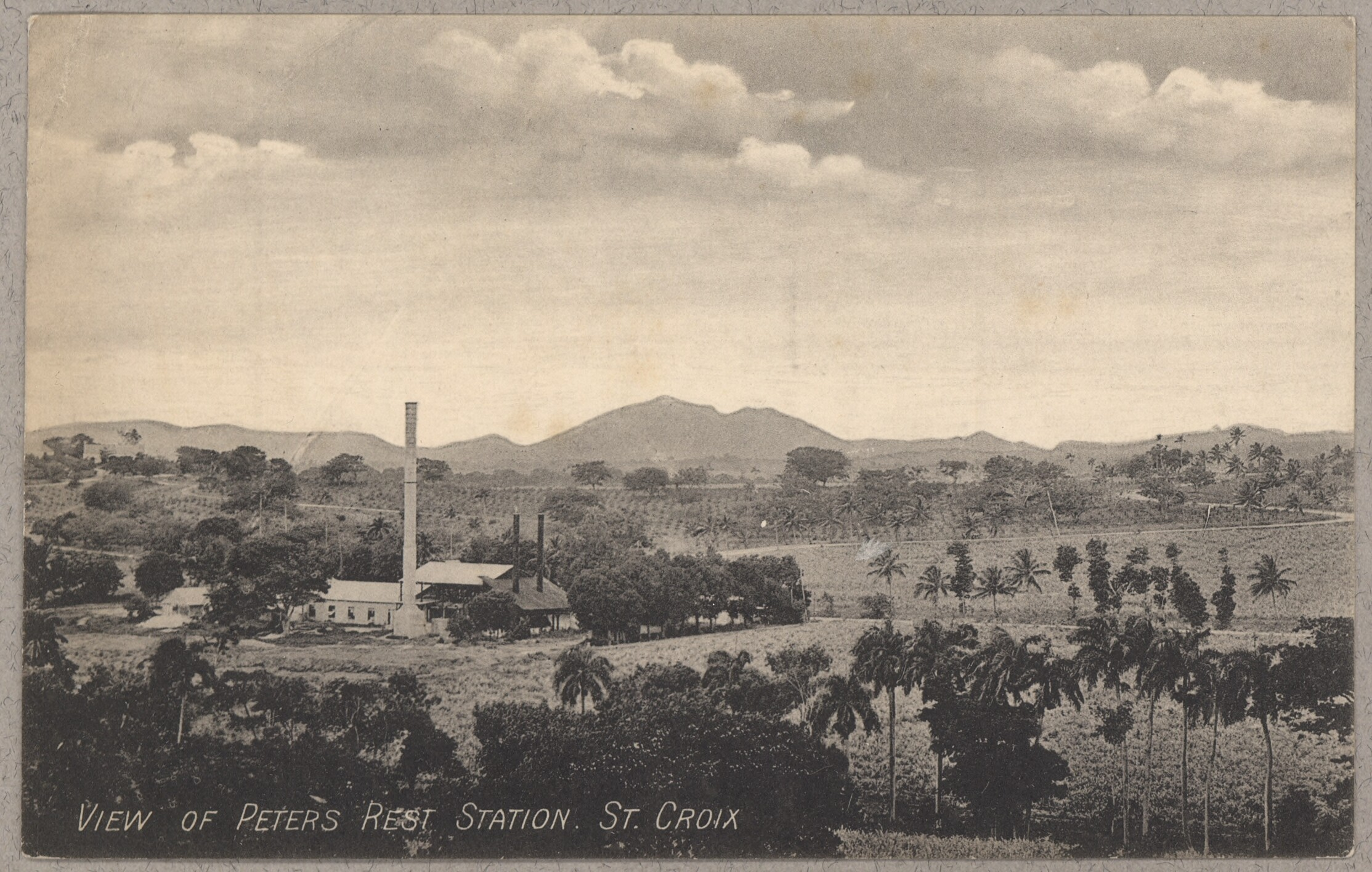
Peters Rest.

Back in January 1837, he had leased the slave plantation Sion Farm; he later bought it. On 8 March 1844, he had also bought Peters Rest (the Stock Estate, Cathrines Rest included) for £4,000. Together with R. Karr, he also owned the slave plantation Lover Love. In 1855 he was commissioned à la suite in the navy and, upon application, received his resignation in 1862 with the rank of counter admiral.

In 1850, Christmas received permission to travel to the West Indies, where he settled in 1853 as a plantation owner on Saint Croix.

He gradually gained an influential position. In 1858–59 he was sent by the Danish government on a diplomatic mission to San Domingo. On 1 April 1865, he became a member of the colonial council and later deputy governor. On the sudden death of Governor Vilhelm Ludvig Birch, in February 1871, he was became acting governor and served as such for four months. He was succeeded by Frantz Bille. Christmas lived on the plantation Peters Rest until his death.

== Personal life ==
Christmas married on 24 May 1823 in Copenhagen to Malvina Benners (1802–1876). She was the daughter of wholesale merchant (grosserer) Isaac Salomon Benners from Kokkedal (c. 1763–1841; also the owner of Vestergade 7) and Marie Christine Applebye (1771–1831). At least five of their seven children lived to adulthood. Their youngest son Walter Christmas-Dirckinck-Holmfeld was the father of writer Walter Christmas.

== Awards ==
Christmas was created a Knight of the order of the Dannebrog in 1845. In 1849, he was awarded the Cross of Honour. In 1859, he was created a Commander of the Order of the Dannebrog.
