= Store Kongensgade 62 =

Building in Copenhagen

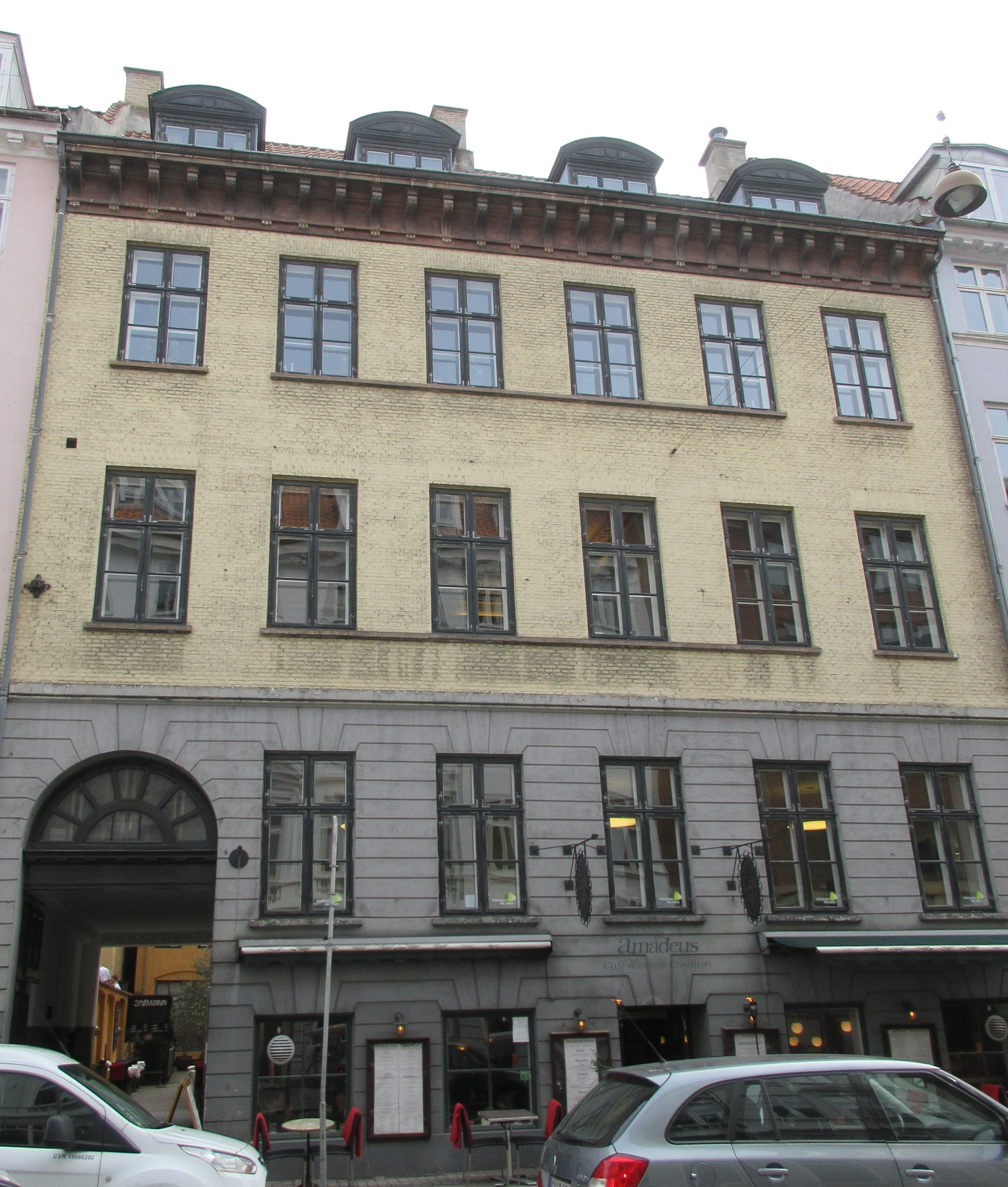
- Interactive map of the Store Kongensgade 62 area

General information
- Location: Copenhagen, Denmark
- Coordinates: 55°41′1.61″N 12°35′16.85″E
- Completed: 1807

Store Kongensgade 62 is a listed property in central Copenhagen, Denmark. The building was listed in the Danish registry of protected buildings and places in 1985.

== History ==
=== Origins ===
In the late 17th century, the site was part of a larger property. This property was listed in Copenhagen's first cadastre from 1689 as No. 130 in St. Ann's East Quarter owned by Hans Christoffersen Richter. In the new cadastre of 1756, it was listed as No. 241. It was by then owned by councilman Abraham Falch.

In the new cadastre of 1806, the property was listed as No. 245. It was owned by Justitsråd Binck's widow at that time.

The present building on the site was constructed in 1807 by master mason and captain in the fire corps Georg Adam Gross (c.1748-1809). In 1810, it was acquired by the wealthy ship captain and merchant John Christmas. He owned it until his death in 1822. He was from 1813 also the owner of the country house Rolighed in Skodsborg.

=== Puggaard family ===
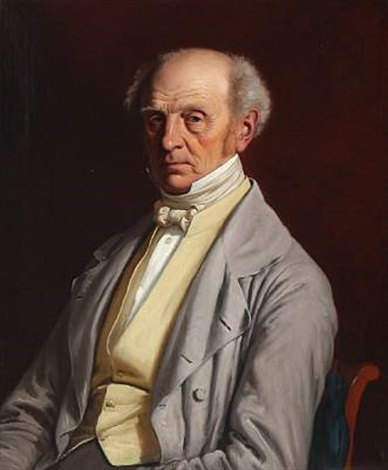
Hans Puggaard painted in c. 1853

The wealthy merchant Hans Puggaard purchased the property in 1830 and owned it until his death in 1865. He lived there with his wife Bolette Puggarrd. Two of her brothers were also residents in the building at different times. Johannes Hage (1800–1837), the editor of the magazine Fædrelandet, was also a resident in the building around 1836. Hother Hage (1816–1873) a National Liberal politician, lived in the building in 1839 and again in 1855. Hans and Bolette Puggaard's daughter Maria Puggaard married Orla Lehmann and they lived in the building in 1863.

The military officer and later Defense Minister Peter Frederik Steinmann (1812–1894) was also a resident in the building in 1836.

At the 1840 census, Puggaard's property weas home to 33 residents. Hans and Bolette Puggaard resided on the second floor with their 19-year-old daughter, Puggaard's niece Pauline Marie Liunge, two male servants and two maids. Broder Peter Hagen, Commandant in Copenhagen, resided on the first floor with his wife Frederike Dorthea Hagen, 23-year-old Johanne Kaap, one male servant and one maid. Sophie Philipsen, a widow with means, resided on the ground floor with three of her children (aged 21 to 27) and two maids. Mads Anker Madsen, a concierge and cooper, resided in the basement with his wife Anne Cathrine Madsen and their 17-year-old daughter. Jens Petersen, a beer seller (øltapper), resided in the basement with his wife Anne Cathrine Petersen, their seven children (aged two to 14) and two maids. Peter Caster, a wholesaler, resided on the first floor of the rear wing with his wife Hedevig Serine Caster and their two children (aged four and seven).

Puggaard's son Rudolph was at the time of the 1845 census still among the residents in the building. Commandant of Copenhagen Broder Peter Hagen (1868-1860) was together with his wife and an unmarried daughter also among the residents. Puggaard's other tenants at the time of the 1845 census were cook for the Russian envoy Jean Henry Oluf Ganiel (born 1817), and flour merchant Johan Peter Alpers (born 1806).

The paper manufacturer Johan Christian Drewsen had his last home in the building in 1850–51.

Cathrine Marie (Polly) Brown, widow of Gustav Holck-Winterfeldt, was for a while a resident of the building. She had previously resided in Gothersgade (now Gothersgade 8) and would later move to an apartment on Toldbodvejen (now Esplanaden 6).

== Architecture ==
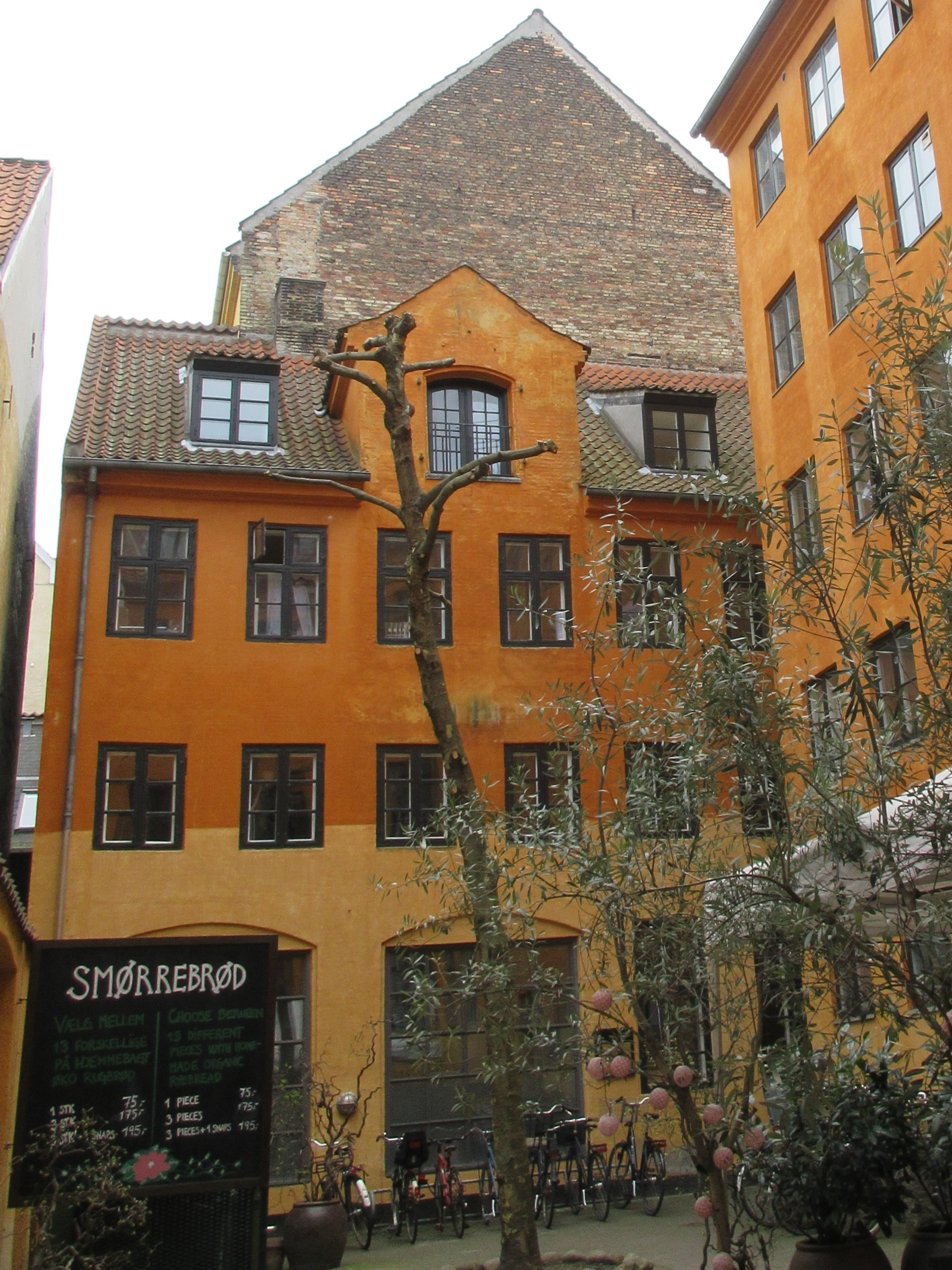
The rear wing

The building consists of three stories over a high cellar and is six bays wide. A gateway on the left side of the building opens to a narrow courtyard lined by a side wing from 1807 to the right and a rear wing from 1807 to the left.

== Today ==
Amadeus, a café and restaurant, is based on the ground floor. VOCE, a private dining concept, is based on the third floor.
