= HDMS Havfruen =

At least eight ships of the Royal Danish Navy have borne the name HDMS Havfruen: between 1563 and 1961. Included in these are:

- HDMS Havfruen (1701) ship-of-the-line (designed by O Judichaer)
- HDMS Havfruen (1760) frigate (designed by F M Krabbe)
- HDMS Havfruen (1790) frigate (designed by E W Stibolt)
- HDMS Havfruen (1825) frigate (designed by A Schifter)
- HDMS Havfruen (1832)
- HDMS Havfruen (P522), a Diana-class patrol vessel
