= Thomas Ter-Borch =

Thomas Ter-Borch (31 January 1762 – 7 March 1812) was a Dutch-born Danish businessman. He served as Austrian consul in Copenhagen.

== Early life and background ==
Thomas Ter-Borch was born on 31 January 1762 in Amsterdam. He was the son of banker Abraham Ter-Borch (1717-?). He moved to Copenhagen in the 1790s.

== Career ==
In Copenhagen, Ter-Borch was licensed as a wholesaler (grosserer). He was a member of Grosserer-Societetet. As of 16 June 1809, the number of wholesale merchants in Copenhagen had increased to 173 (cf. list below). He partnered with Charles August Selby. Their company traded as Selby & Ter-Borch and later, after they had been joined by John Christmas, as Selby, Christmas & Ter-Borch. The company was headquartered in Thomas Ter-Borch's property at Dronningens Tværgade 7.

In 1796, Selby / Ter-Burch owned fuive ships.

In 1794, Selby and Co. purchased the Union House sugar refinery on Strandgade in Christianshavn. In 1800, when Selby retired to his country estates, it was acquired by Christmas, Ter-Borch & Company.

== Personal life and legacy ==
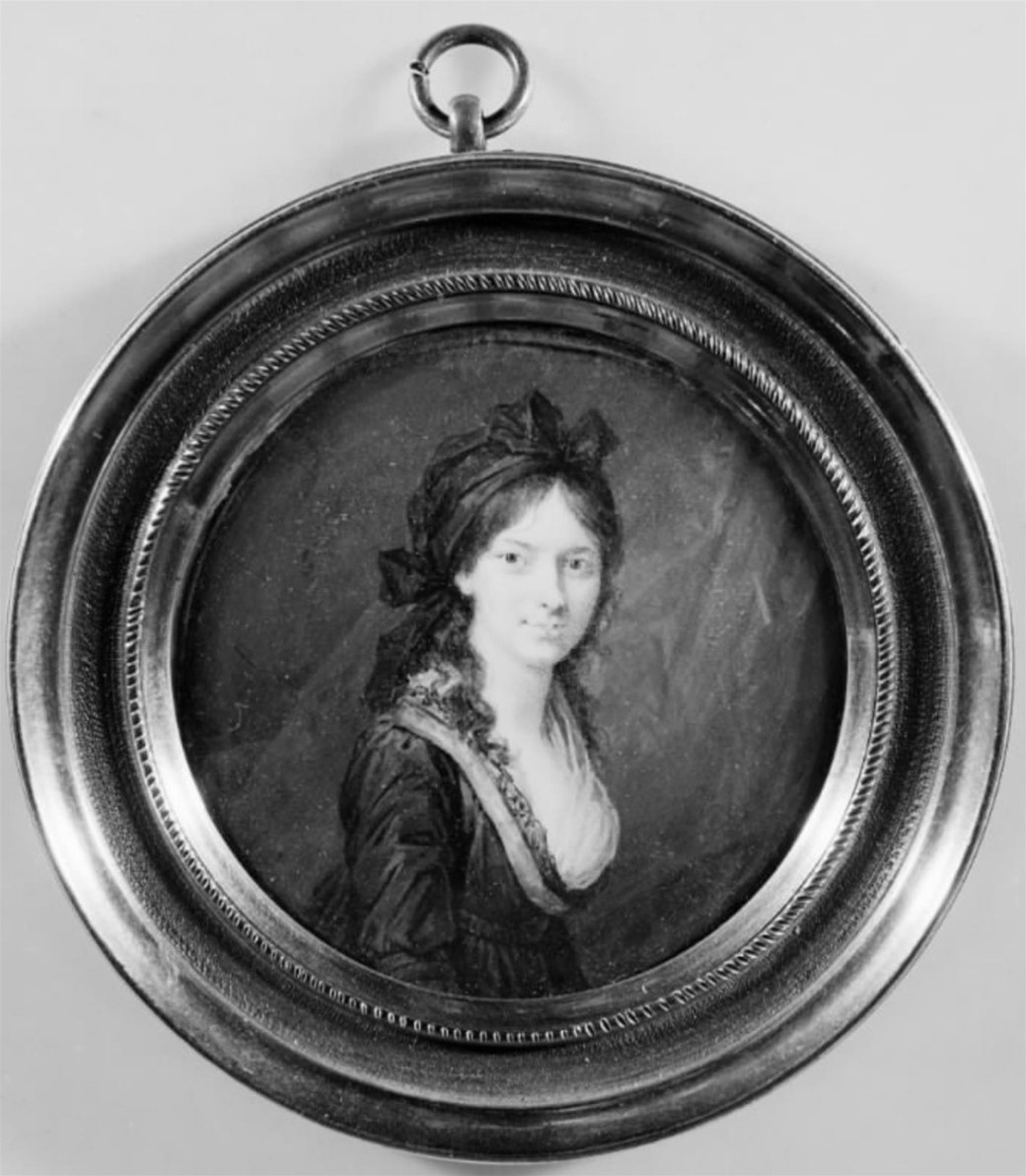
Anna Elisabeth Ter Borch by Cornelius Høyerm c. 1802.

In 1802, Ter-Borch married to Anna Elisabeth Heinrich (1782–1826). She was the youngest of six children of Johan Friedrich Heinrich (1730–1808), a former director of the Danish West India Company and Birgitte Lexmond (1738–1811). Back in 1786, he had headed a Danish delegation in negotiations with Abraham Ter-Borch concerning a loan of 11 million gylden to a group of planters on Saint Croix. Ter-Borch and his wife had a son and three daughters. Their son Thomas Julius Ter-Borch (1803–1830) studied law. He was married to Juliane Bull. The daughter Johanne Frederikke Ter-Borch (1804–1857) was married to Ove Emrich Høegh Guldberg (1793–1843), a grandson of Ove Høegh-Guldberg. The second-eldest daughter Juliane Johanne Ter-Borch married to the military officer and amtmand Mathias Reinhold von Jessen (189+-1853). The daughter Maria Ter-Borch (died 1854) married to Diderius Bernhardus Liedermooij (1784-).

Ter-Borch owned the property Dronningens Rværgade 7. In 1810, he bought the country house Lindslyst from Jens Lind. It was subsequently renamed Taffel-Bay.

On 2 March 1784, Ter-Borch became a member of the Order of the Chain (Knight from 2 December 1787).

Ter-Norch died in 1812. He is buried at Assistens Cemetery (Section B). His timb features a portrait relief of him as well as a relief of Mercury and Neptinus.

His widow married in 1813 to Israel Suell (1782–1860). Ter-Borch's trading firm was subsequently continued as Israel Suell, Ter Broch & Company, It went bankrupt in 1819.
