= HDMS Rota =

HDMS Rota may refer to:

- HDMS Rota (1801) a frigate of the Royal Danish-Norwegian Navy
- HDMS Rota (1822), a frigate of the Royal Danish Navy
