= Peters Rest, U.S. Virgin Islands =

Coordinates: 17°43′31″N 64°44′20″W

Peters Rest, United States Virgin Islands
- Village
- Interactive map of Peters Rest, United States Virgin Islands
- Country: United States Virgin Islands
- Island: Saint Croix
- Time zone: UTC-4 (AST)

Peters Rest is a settlement on the island of Saint Croix in the United States Virgin Islands. The settlement originally formed around a sugar plantation.

== History ==
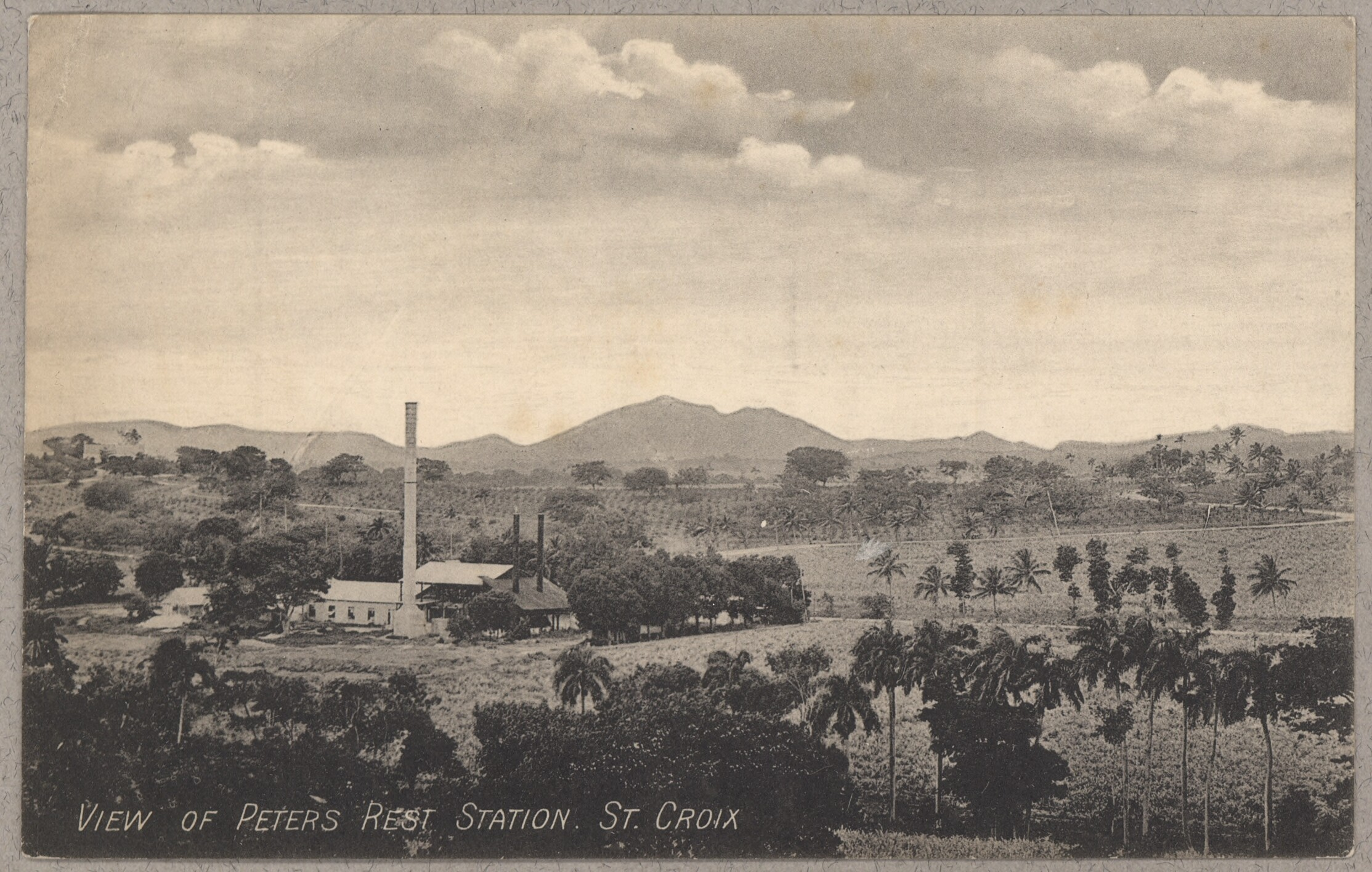
Peters Rest.

Peters Rest (Queens Quarter No. 35 &. 36, Centre Police District, Christiansteds Jurisdiction) is a former sugar plantation. As of 1816, it had a total area of 225 acres of which 122 acres were planted with sugar canes and 103 acres were under other cultivation. 194 enslaved labourers were present on the estate.

On 28 June 1828, Peters Rest was sold at auction to J.F . Pinney, for Ps. 111,701. On 8 March 1844, it was sold by W. W. Coker, as attorney to J. F. Pinney, to Capt. John Christmas (the Stock Estate, Cathrines Rest included) for £ 4,000.

Christmas settled permanently on the island in 1853. He resided at Peters Rest until his death. His grandson, Walter Christmas, was involved in attempts to sell the former Danish West Indies to the United States in the early 20th century.
