= HDMS Rota (1822) =

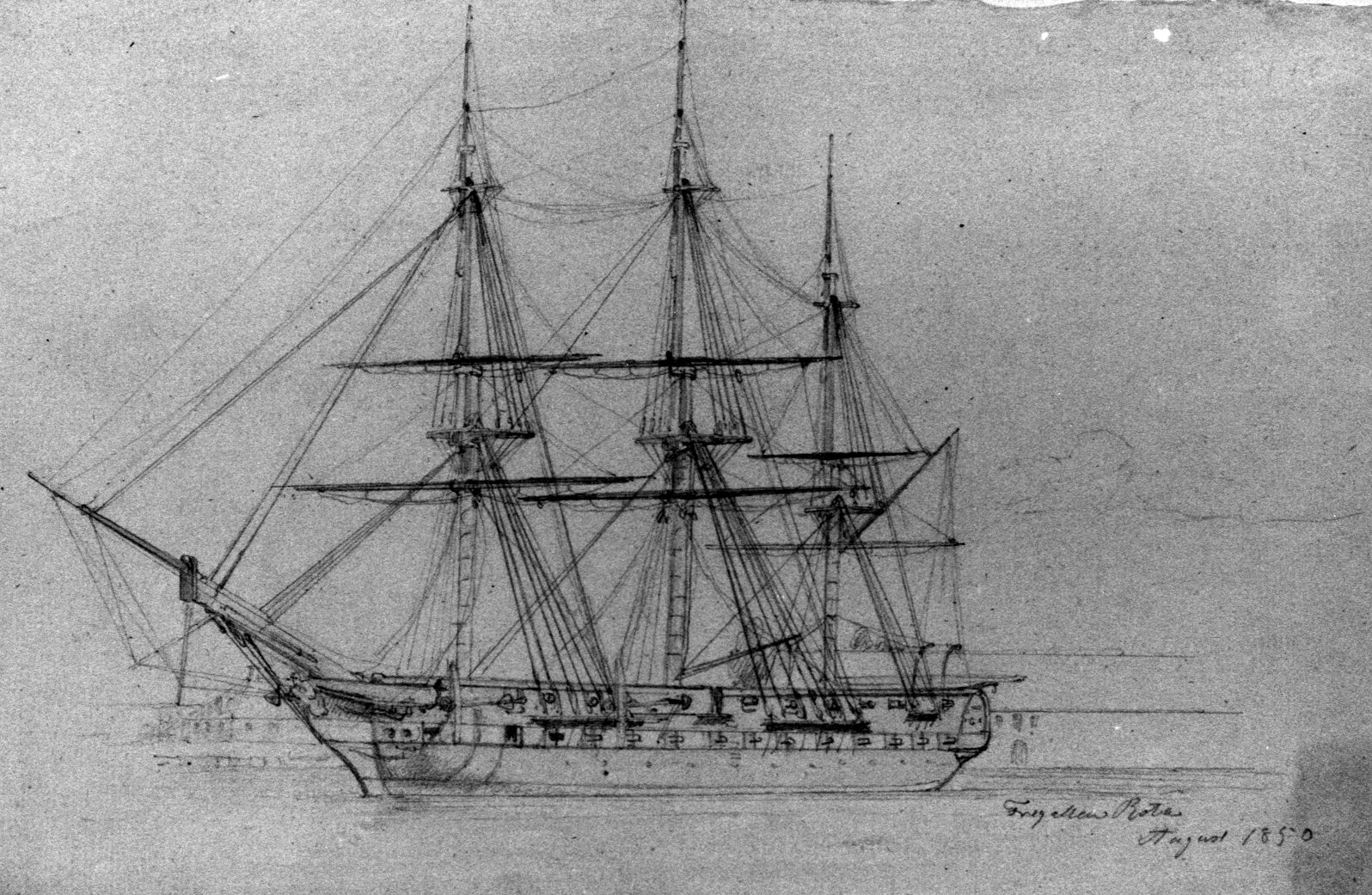
- Rota on a drawing from 1850.

History

Denmark
- Name: Rota
- Owner: Royal Danish Navy
- Builder: Royal Danish Naval Dockyard
- Launched: 31 July 1822
- Commissioned: 9 May 1838
- Fate: Sold in auction

Denmark
- Name: Rota af København
- Owner: H. Puggaard & Co.
- Acquired: 1863
- Fate: Sold

Norway
- Name: Rota
- Owner: Paul Larsen, Arendal in
- Acquired: 1882
- Fate: Wrecked 1892

General characteristics
- Class & type: Frigate
- Length: 48.09 m
- Armament: In Danish service: 46 x 16-pounder guns

HDMS Rota was a frigate of the Royal Danish Navy. She is above all remembered for being the ship that, in 1838, picked up the sculptor Bertel Thorvaldsen and many of his artworks in Livorno and brought them back to Denmark. Hans Dahlerup, her captain, and Alexander Wilde, then a junior lieutenant, have both described the voyage in their memoirs. In 1863, Rota was sold to H. Puggaard & Co. and converted into a civilian merchant ship. She wrecked off the coast of southern Norway in 1892, some ten years after being sold to Paul Larsen, Arendal.

== Construction and design ==
Rota was built at Nyholm to a design by Andreas Schifter. She was one of four frigates in the same class. The others were HDMS Freya (1824-1853), HDMS Havfruen (1825) (1832-1864) and HDMS Bellona (1830) (1835-1862). Construction started on 15 November 1819 and ended on 7 October 1823. She was launched on 31 July 1822.

Rota was 48.09 metres (157 ft 9 in) long, with a beam of 11.84 metres (38 ft 10 in) and a draught of 5.42 metres (17 ft 9 in). She displaced 705.5 1/2 læster (c. 1.11 tons). Her complement was 404 men. Her initial gun armament was 28 18-pounder guns, 28 8-pounder gunsand 4 12-pounder howitzers. It was later changed to 46 18-pounder guns.

== Naval career ==
=== Mediterranean ===
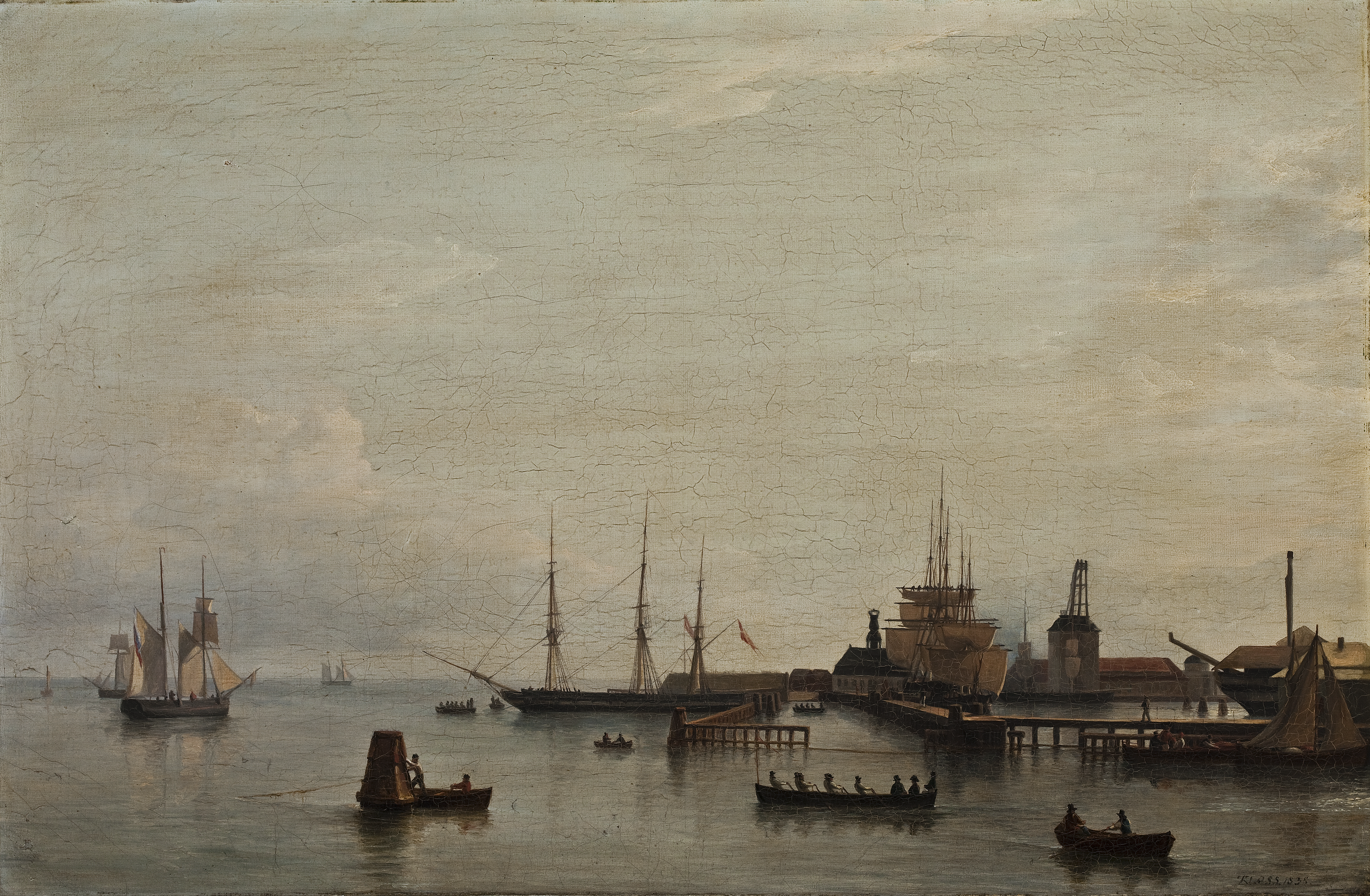
A view of the harbour of Copenhagen seen from the redoubt at Toldboden. At Nyholm the frigate Rota is readying its sails and the corvette Flora is being hauled out.

Rota was commissioned by the Royal Danish Navy on 9 May 1838. It had been decided to send her to Livorno to pick up the sculptor Bertel Thorvaldsen, who had finally decided to return to Denmark after 40 years in Rome, as well as many of his artworks which would later be installed in the new Thorvaldsens Museum. The first 52 boxes with his artworks had already been transported to Denmark onboard the frigate St. Croix (capt. Martinus Christian de Klauman) in 1825. In April 1827, 70 boxes with artworks were picked up by the merchant ship Therese (capt. Schröder). Another 65 boxes of artworks, maonly for installation in the Church of Our Lady and Christiansborg Palace, both of which were under reconstruction after fires, had been transported to Denmark onboard the corvette Galathea in 1833. In 1835 Bellona had been sent to Livorno to pick Thorvaldsen and more of his artworks up, but the sculptor had with short notice decided to postpone his own return to Denmark.

On the first leg of the journey, Rota would be accompanied by the brigs Alart and St. Croix as well as the corvette Flora. Alart and St. Croix would then continue to the Danish West Indies, whereas Flora, a naval training ship for midshipmen, was supposed to follow Rota all the way. Rota was under command of captain Hans Dahlerup and Hans Fisker was second-in-command. Alexander Wilde was a junior lieutenant. The sculptor Jens Adolf Jerichau, who had just graduated from the Royal Danish Academy of Fine Art, was onboard as a passenger.

The four ships departed from Copenhagen on 11 May 1838 but lost contact with each other when they encountered a snow storm from Ene off the coast of Norway. They were reunited in Norway but again separated in the English Channel due to thick fog from the southwest. The situation did not improve in the Bay of Biscay, where foul weather and treacherous currents only permitted St. Croix to follow Rota. Rota then continued into the Mediterranean Sea alone and arrived at Livorno on 9 July. The artworks, 62 boxes, some of them very large and heavy, arrived a few days later, but it was still unclear weather Thorvaldsen would actually return with them. Dahlerup would later describe his first meeting with Thorvaldsen as well as the journey home in his memoirs Mit Livs Begivenheder:

I…. decided to go to Rome myself to pick him up, in which there would always be a greater honor, which was bound to have some effect on him, making it less easy for him to decline. [,,,] I had taken my uniform on to show my official errand and to pay due honor to the man whom the king had decided to pick up by a warship.

I met Thorvaldsen in shirt sleeves, which he usually wore in the summer at home in his living room. There was someonethere with him, and seemingly a little embarrassed to receive me "en dishabillé", he wanted to grab a jacket in a hurry, but stayed at my urging as he was, and we would soon agree on everything.

—I was now first to have a look around Rome for a few days, while he settled some minor still unsettled affairs, and we could then decide on the day of departure.

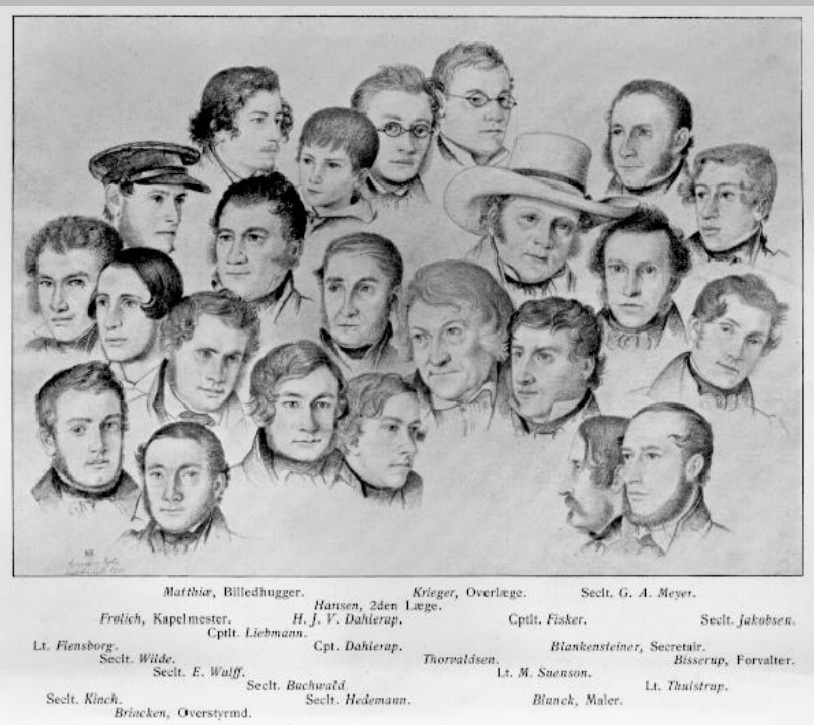
Dutlev Blunck: The officers and artists onboard HDMS Rota, 1838. A more precise indication of who is who can be seen here.

Dahlerup and Thorvaldsen ended up leaving Rome on 5 August at midnight. They boarded the ship on 7 August: The painter Ditlev Blunck, composer Johannes Frederik Fröhlich and sculptor Wilhelm Matthiä were also returning to Denmark with the ship. Dahlerup describes their arrival in his memoirs:

As the boats approached the ship, the flags were hoisted, and when everybody had come on board, where I and the officers received them at the Jacob's ladder, while the whole crew in festive attire was lined up in front, I embraced Thorvaldsen and welcomed him on Danish ground, whereupon I turned to the crew and said: "Let us wish our highly acclaimed Countryman Welcome among us!" which was answered with a triple hooray while a Salute of nine shots was fired. This reception seemed to delight the glorious old man.

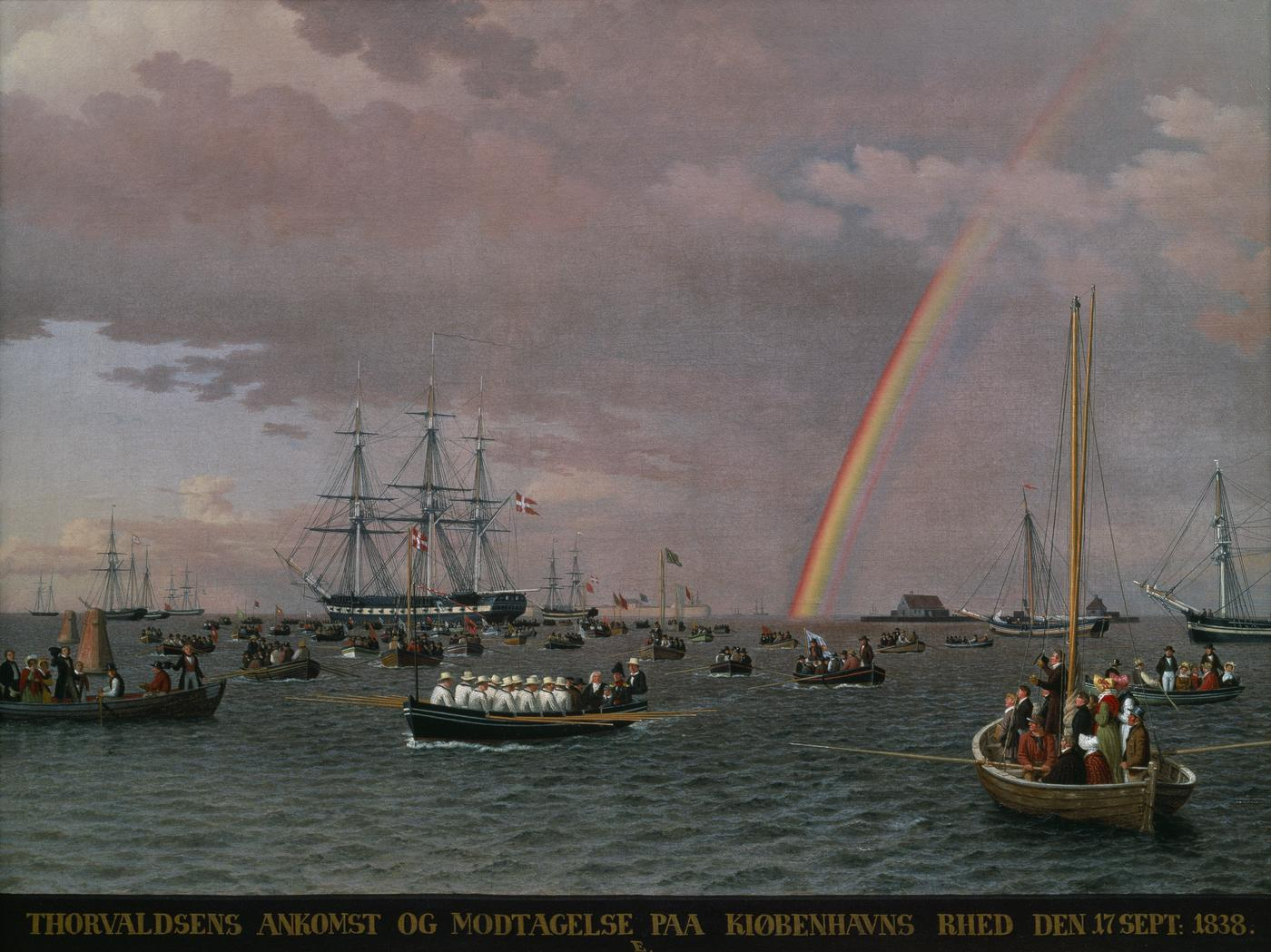
Thorvaldsen arriving at the Københavns Red, 1838.

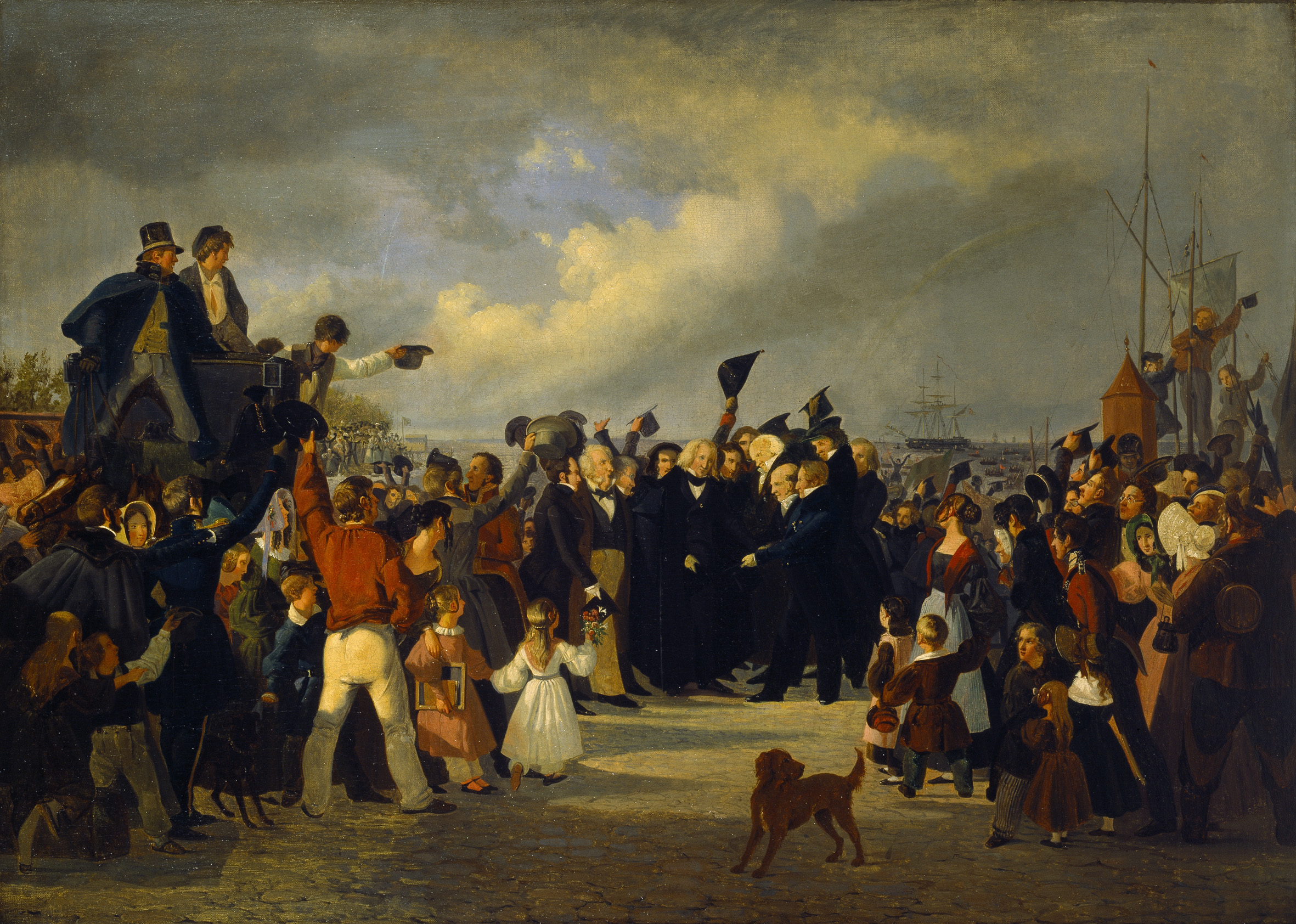
Contemporary painting by Fritz Westphal of Thorvaldsen's reception as a national hero on his return to Denmark in 1838.

Homeward bound, Rota left Livorno on 9 August. The journey home was uneventful. In mid September, Rota was forced to anchor at Ellekilde Hage due to tailwind and storm at sunset. She remained there for a few days as the foul weather continued until being towed to Copenhagen by a steamship on 17 September

The trip through the Sound became a true triumphal procession, even though it was foggy. Both from the Danish and Swedish coasts, it was crowded with boats full of festively dressed people shouting hurray and throwing flower wreaths into the water.

On 17 September at 16-17 the frigate anchored at Kastelspynten: "It was no easy matter for my large and wide chalup with its long oars to make its way through the bustling crowd of boats, fully packed with ornate gentlemen and ladies.

Slowly and with caution, so as not to injure anyone with our ores, we progressed under a relentless, deafening cheer and hurrays.

When we got to the stairs, all the steps were crowded with people, and the whole square above me was a rolling forest of human heads, which made it impossible for me to see the carriage on standby, where we were to set our steps.

Thorvaldsen climbed into the carriage, someone harnessed the horse and off we went it to Charlottenborg, where he was to live until further notice. That evening there was a torchlight procession.

What remained of Thorvaldsen's extensive collections in Rome was transported back to Denmark by ship in 1839 (Galathea, capt. Jens Seidelin, 42 boxes), 1842 (Thetis, capt. Christian Christopher Zahrtmann, 120 boxes), 1944 (Gefion, capt. Hans Georg Garde, 136 boxes) and 1845 (Dania, capt. Breckvold, 9 boxes).

=== First Schleswig War ===
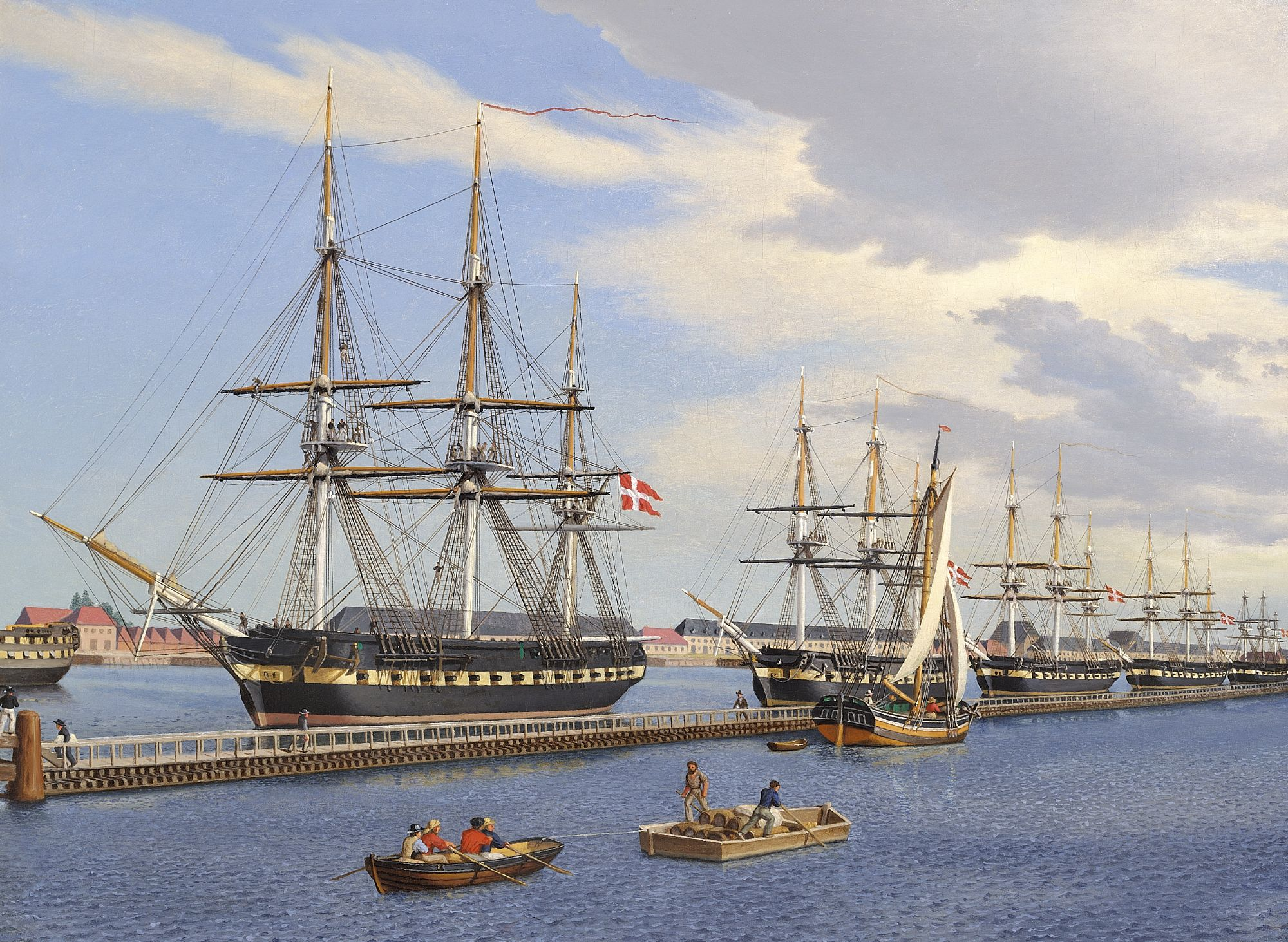
C. W. Eckersberg: Gefion, Thetis, Bellona, Havfruen and Rota. in Copenhagen, 1849.

From 9 March 1849 until 13 September 1849, Eckersberg has also created a drawing of Rota and four other Danish frigates fitting out in Copenhagen in the spring of 1849. He notes in his diary on February 2, 1850: "Finished the drawing of the five frigates fitting out on March 13, 1849." The five frigates hoisting their colours in mid-March 1849 were the Gefion, Thetis, Bellona, Havfruen and Rota. The Freja was ready on March 24 and after the loss of the Gefion, the old Nymphen was also put in active service on 25 April 1849.

Rota participated in the First Schleswig War. She was under command of John Christmas. The eldest son of English-born ship captain and merchant John Christmas, Christmas would later reach the rank of admiral in the Royal Danish Navy.

=== Training and accommodation ship ===
From 29 April 1856 to 19 August 1856, Rotawas in use as a training ship. She was under the command of captain Frederik Paludan. In 1861, she was used as an accommodation ship. She was under the command of captain lieutenant P. C. Albeck.

== Civilian career and fate ==
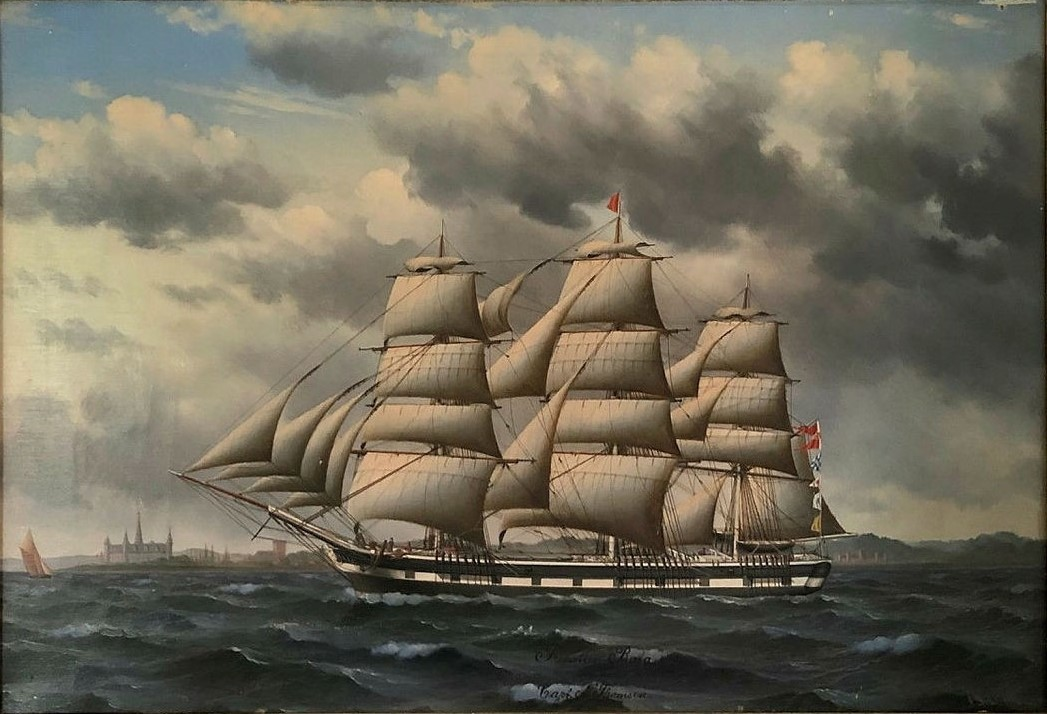
Rota af K'benhavn painted by J. Dahl in 1880.

In 1863, Rota was decommissioned from the Royal Danish Navy and sold to H. Puggaard & Co. In August 1864, she was adapted for use as a merchant ship by ship builder P. Brandt. In 1865, sje was sold to Det Kjøbenhavnske Skibsrederi I/S (affiliated H. Puggaard & Co.).

In its time as a civilian merchant ship, Rota was first captained by A.J. Hänschell (1864-). Gustav Møller (Galloper-Møller), August Frederik Andrea and P. J. Hansen (1872-). N. Thomsen, a half brother of Rudolph Puggaard's daughter Signe, captained the ship from 1872 until the sale in 1882. He brought many exsotic animals home to Copenhagen Zoo.

On 5 May 1882, Rota af København was sold in London to one Paul Larsen from Arendal in Norway. In 1892, she wrecked at Lemann Ower Bankerne om spithern Norway.

== Commemoration ==
Hans Dahlerup has described his 1838 voyage with Rota in his memoirs Mit Livs Begivenheder I-IV. Alexander Wilde, who served as a junior lieutenant on the same voyage, has described it in Erindringer om Jerichau og Thorvaldsen ombord paa Fregatten Rota 1838 (1884).

Frederik Theodor Kloss has painted A view of the harbour of Copenhagen seen from the redoubt at Toldboden. At Nyholm the frigate Rota is readying its sails and the corvette for midshipmen training Flora is being hauled out (1838). The painting was bought by Bertel Thorvaldsen after the Charlottenborg Exhibition of 1839 and it is now on display in Thorvaldsen's Museum. Christoffer Wilhelm Eckersberg has painted Thorvaldsen arriving at the Københavns Red (1838–39). The painting shows Bertel Thorvaldsen—white-haired and dressed in black—being rowed ashore from the frigate Rota in 1838. Eckersberg chose the moment when a rainbow appeared behind the ships and boats, and made a study of it, and although Thorvaldsen could only be glimpsed at, he liked it and ordered this painting. The painting is now also on display in Thorvaldsen's Museum. Friedrich Bernhard Westphal has also painted The Reception of Thorvaldsen on Toldboden (1939, Thorvaldsens Museum). The reception of Thorvaldsen at Toldboden is also the subject of Jørgen Sonne's monumental picture fruieze on the exterior of Thorvaldsens Museum. Dahlerup is seen right behind Thorvaldsen.
