= Rolighed (Skodsborg) =

Country house in Skodsborg, Denmark

Coordinates: 55.8402°N 12.5699°E

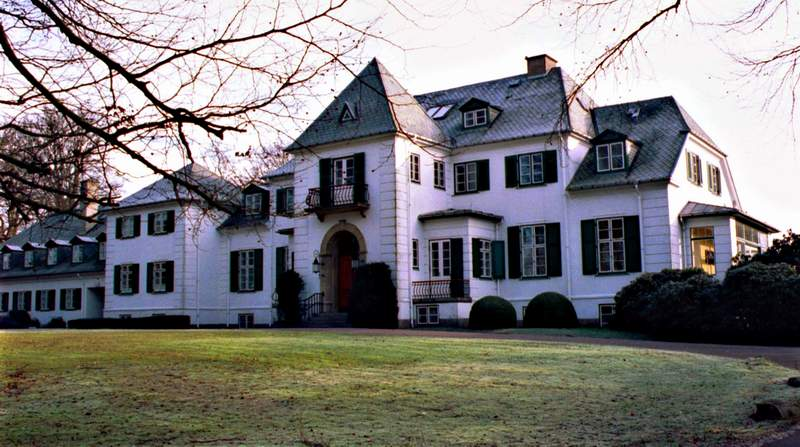
Rolighed (the currentbuilding) photographed in 1927

Rolighed is a former country house in Skodsborg, Rudersdal Municipality, approximately 16 km north of Copenhagen, Denmark. The history of the property dates back to 1780 but the current house is from 1927. Formerly associated with the Conservative People's Party, it now houses Mærsk's Center of Leadership.

== History ==
=== Anker family ===
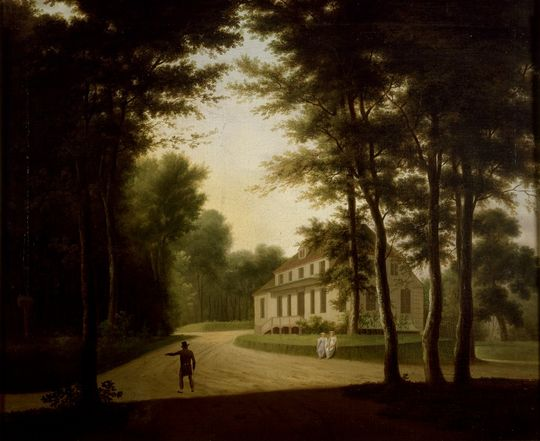
Rolighed in c. 1805. Painting by Elias Meyer

The land was acquired by the Norwegian civil servant Carsten Anker in 1780. In 1794, he built a large wooden house on his estate. On 15-16 August, 1807, when the British Army landed their troops at Vedbæk, leading up to the Battle of Copenhagen, they confiscated many of the large country houses along the coast. The Anker family was, however, on a good foot with the British commander, general Arthur Wellesley, with whom Carsten Anker's brother Peter Anker, had previously collaborated, and Rolighed therefore escaped confiscation.

In 1813 when Denmark lost Norway, Carsten Anker returned home to Norway, selling Rolighed to John Christmas, an English-born merchant from Copenhagen.

=== Christmas, Dunzfeldt and Brown ===
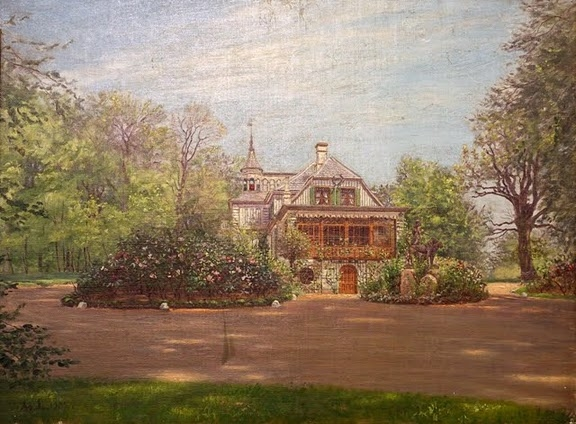
Rolighed painted by Adolph Larsen

After his death in 1822, Rolighed was taken over by his son-in-law, William Frederik Duntzfelt, a merchant and politician. He commissioned Jørgen Hansen Koch to design a new house that was completed in 1825. In 1841, Duntzfelt sold the property to the British diplomat Peter Browne.

=== Grøn family ===
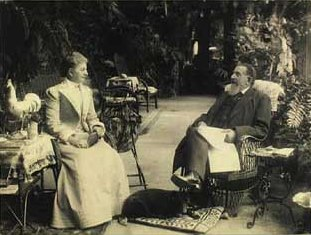
Ludvig Jens Grøn with his family at Rolighed in August 1902

When Browne returned to Britain in 1862, he sold Rolighed to Ludvig Jens Grøn, the founder of Grøns Varehus, Copenhagen's first department store. A new guesthouse designed by Henrik Steffens Sibbern was built on the estate in 1866–67. Grøn and his wife lived in the house for many years until it was taken over by their son R. Howard Grøn. He had been amtmann of the Diocese of Viborg and commissioned the Viborg-based architect Søren Vig-Nielsen to design a new an considerably bigger house which was built between 1927 and 1930. The building represents the style known as Bedre Byggeskik (Better Building Practices), the Danish equivalent of the Arts & Crafts movement.

=== Later history ===
The property was in 1959 sold to The Foundation of 28 May 1948 which placed it at disposition of the Conservative People´s Party. It was subsequently converted into a meeting venue by Ole Hagen.

== Today ==
In 2010, the foundation sold Rolighed to Maersk. It subsequently went through a thorough restoration and expansion carried out by Erik Møller Arkitekter. It now houses Mærsk's Center of Leadership

== See also ==
- Enrum
