= William Frederik Duntzfelt =

Danish merchant and politician

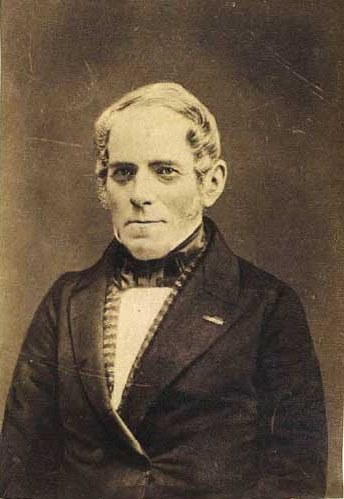
- Born: 12 June 1792; Copenhagen, Denmark
- Died: 12 October 1863 (aged 71); Copenhagen, Denmark
- Occupations: Businessman and politician
- Awards: Commander of the Order of the Dannebrog; Knight of the Dannebrog, 1840

William Frederik Duntzfelt (12 June 1792 – 12 October 1863) was a Danish merchant. He continued Duntzfelt & Co. but left the company in 1825. He was also a member of the 1848 Danish Constituent Assembly.

== Early life and education ==
Duntzfelt was born in Copenhagen, the son of merchant William Duntzfelt and Marie Henriette de Coninck (1774–1843). His maternal grandfather was the wealthy merchant Frédéric de Coninck.

== Career ==
He continued the family firm after his father's death in 1809 and was granted citizenship as a merchant in 1812. He became a member of Grosserer-Societetet's committee in 1819 but pulled out of Duntzfelt & Co. in 1825.

He was one of the directors of the Danish Asiatic Company in 1837 and headed the liquidation of the company in 1843.

== Politics ==
Duntzfelt became one of the City's 32 Men in 1838 and continued his position on the Copenhagen City Council in 1840. He became a councilman in 1848.

Duntzfelt was elected to the Roskilde Provincial Assembly in 1842, 1844, and 1846 and was also a member of the 1849 Danish Constituent Assembly.

He was awarded the title etatsråd in 1857 and the Order of the Dannebrog in 1840.

== Personal life ==
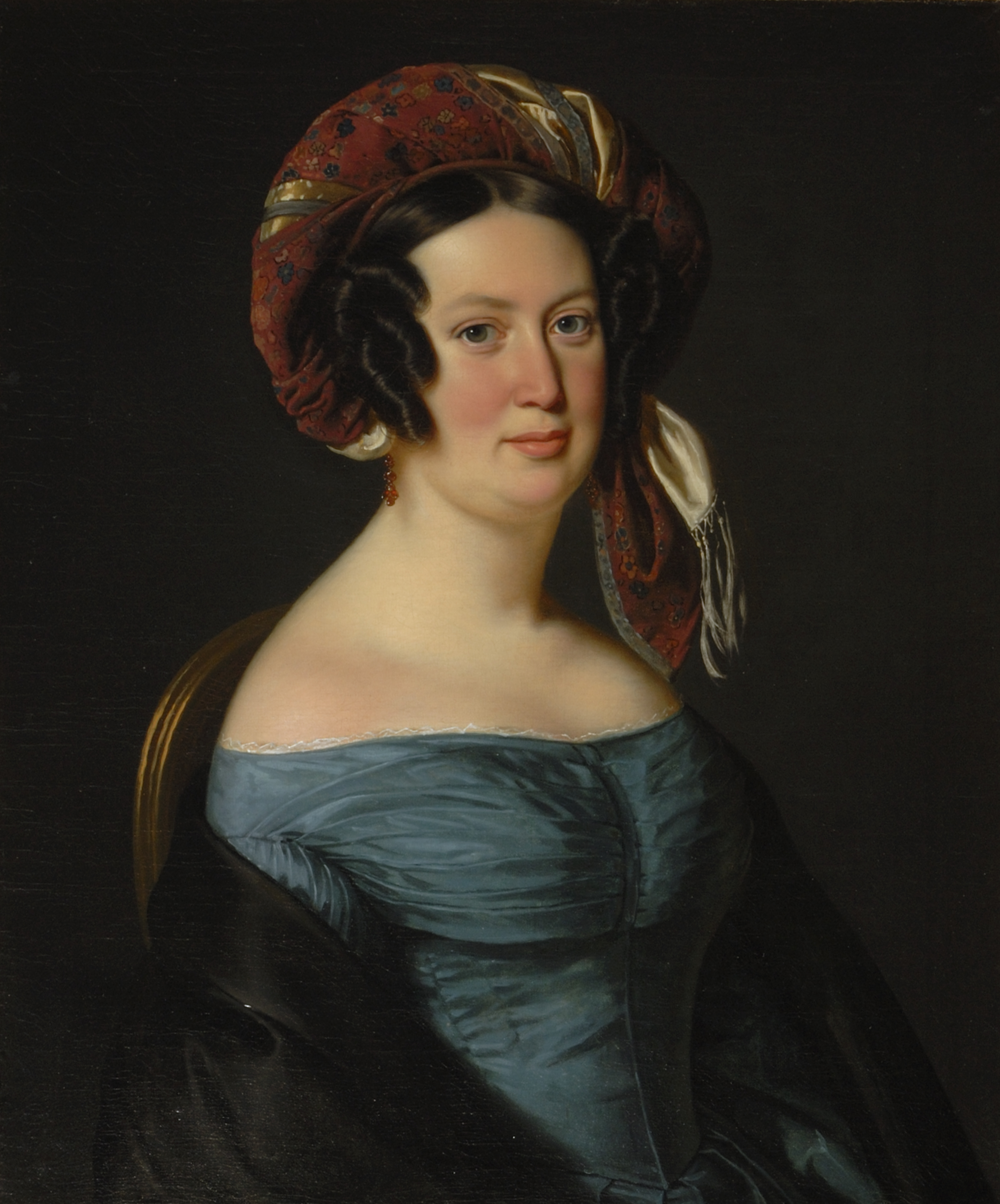
Bertha Duntzfelt painted by David Monies

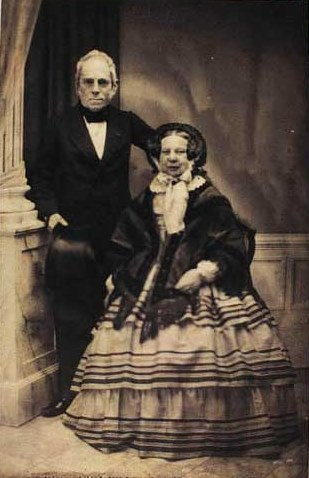
Duntzfelt and his wife

on 13 October 1814 in the Reformed Church in Copenhagen, Duntzfelt married to Bertha Christmas (1797–1872), daughter of ship captain John Christmas (1753–1822) and Johanne Marie Heinrich (1771–1808). They had three children, John William Duntzfelt, Marie Duntzfelt and Edward Duntzfelt.

Duntzfelt died on 12 October 1863 and is buried in Assistens Cemetery.
