= John Christmas (sea captain) =

English-born Danish sea captain and general trader

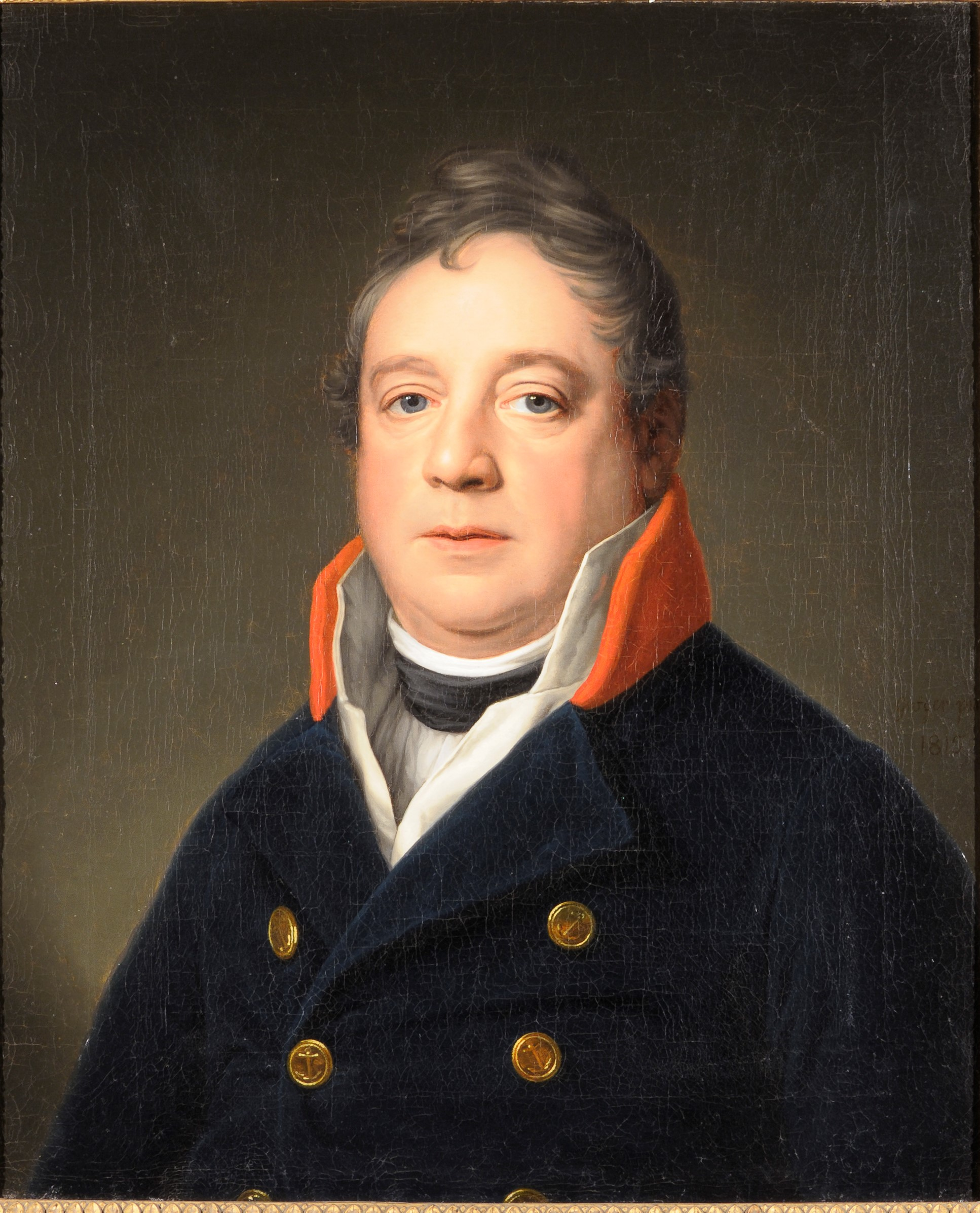
- Portrait of John Christmas by Friedrich Carl Gröger, 1815.
- Born: John Christmas Smith; October 13, 1753; Bideford, Devonshire, England
- Died: January 6, 1822 (aged 68); Høveltegaard, Denmark
- Occupations: Sea captain, Merchant
- Relatives: John Christmas (son); Walter Christmas (great-grandson); John Christmas Møller (great-great-grandson)

John Christmas (13 October 1753—6 January 1822) was an English-born Danish sea captain and merchant. Christmas was born in Bideford, and emigrated to Denmark in 1790. He became a merchant and business owner in Copenhagen. He was the father of naval officer and plantation owner on Saint Croix in the Danish West Indies, John Christmas.

== Personal life and family ==
John was born on 13 October 1753 in Bideford, Devonshire and was the son of merchant John Smith and his wife Judith Rebecca Hopkins. He was originally given both his father's and his paternal grandmother's surnames, and was baptized as John Christmas Smith. Through his father's side of the family (his paternal grandmother, Jane Christmas), he was a descendant of the Christmas family of Waterford, Ireland. The family had originally come from England, but rose to prominence in Ireland as High Sheriffs of Waterford and MPs. The politician Thomas Christmas was John's grandmother's first cousin. Thomas' son married into the noble Irish Beresford family. In Denmark, John would claim to have a closer connection to the noble Beresford family, than he actually did, and even gave a son the middle name of Beresford.

In 1790, he was permitted by the British crown to adopt the surname Christmas and to bear the family's coat of arms registered by the College of Arms in London. Thus he and his descendants bear the name Christmas. The coat of arms consists of a barrel above a helmet and a shield. The shield contains a field of red and a gold serrated fess over which there are three black ravens.

John was married three times and had no fewer than seventeen children. He was married to Charlotte Maria Bearsley in 1778–1788, Johanne Maria "Hanne" Heinrich in 1797–1803, and Eliza Ferrall in 1820–1822.

He married Charlotte Maria Bearsley (1757–1820) on 24 February 1778 in Porto, Portugal, and the couple had seven children together: Charlotte Maria (1779–1809), Sophia (1780–1833), Laura (1781–1827), Susan (1783–1814), Jane (1784–1788), Edward (1786–c.1806), and William (1788–1788). All of these children were given the surname Smith, as they were born before their father had been given the right to use the name Christmas in 1790. John and Charlotte Maria separated in 1788, but were not formally divorced until 1 December 1796.

On 5 January 1797 at Sparresholm, Denmark, John married Johanne Maria "Hanne" Heinrich (1771–1808). Hanne was the daughter of Johan Friedrich Heinrich, an advisor to the king and former director of the Danish West India Company. The couple had three children. Their daughter Birthe (1797–1872) married William Frederik Duntzfelt. Their eldest son Admiral John Christmas (1799–1873) was acting governor of the Danish West Indies, and died on his plantation Peters Rest on St. Croix. Their youngest child George Beresford Christmas (1800–1867) also spent time in the Danish West Indies as a naval officer. Their great-grandson, Walter Christmas, later played a large role in the sale of the islands to the United States. John and Hanne were separated on 15 June 1803. She was married two more times after that, first with doctor Johannes Lorenzen (1774–1807) and then actor Niels Simonsen, before she died only 37 years old in 1808.

After separating from Hanne, John had several other children outside marriage. He acknowledged having three children with Anne Christine Lynge (c.1782–1827): Frederik Christmas (1804–1865), Ferdinand Christmas (1806–unknown), and Albert Christmas (1810–c.1840). John and Anne Christine lived as a couple at his country house Høveltegaard, presumably until 1810 or 1811, when both of them moved separately back to Copenhagen. A descendent of Frederik Christmas' line is politician John Christmas Møller.

John also acknowledged having four children with Wilhelmine Christine Boldt (1783–1860): Johanne Wilhelmine (1807–1895), Juliane Thomine (1809–unknown), John Hermann (1811–1818), and Wilhelm Julius (1815–1890). These children went on to use their mother's surname Boldt, although they seem to have been baptized as Christmas.

Lastly, John married Eliza Ferrall (1778–1845) on 14 December 1820 at Høveltegaard, Denmark. Eliza had been widowed by the death of her first husband, merchant Philip Ryan, in 1809.

== Career ==
He moved to Copenhagen in 1790. That same year, he was licensed as a merchant (grosserer). He joined Charles August Selby's and Thomas Ter-Borch's trading firm Selby & Co. which from then on traded first as Selby, Christmas and Ter Borch and after Selby's retirement as Christmas & Ter Borch. The firm was from 1800 based in Thomas Ter Borch's property at Dronningens Tværgade 7. Christmas obtained Danish citizenship 23 March 1801.

Christmas traveled to India for trade at least three times in the 1790s and also sailed at least once to the Danish West Indies.

== Property ==
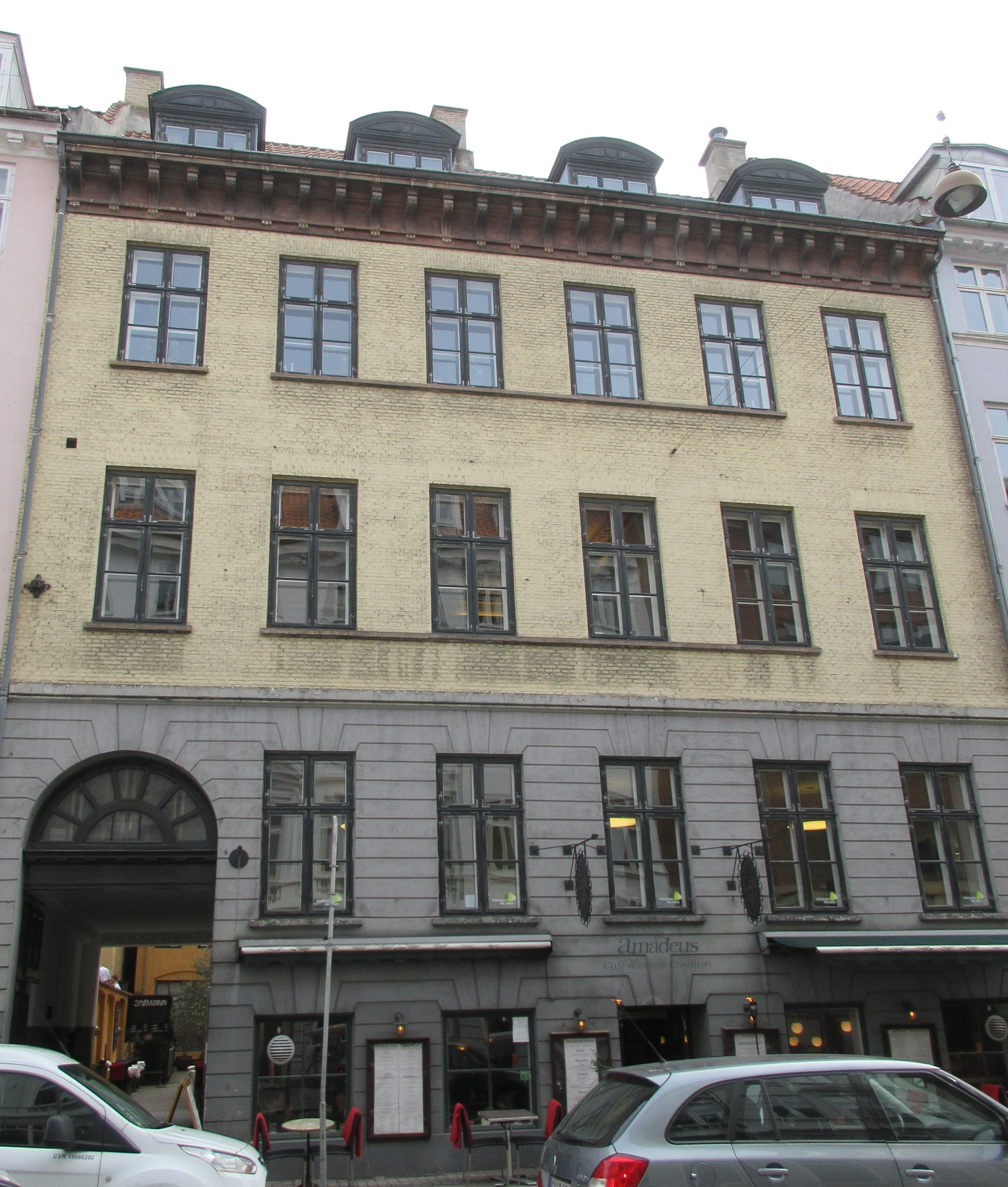
Store Kongensgade 62 in Copenhagen

John's residence for the first few years in Copenhagen from 1790 to 1793 is unknown. In 1793, he purchased Stanley House. It is a distinctly English-inspired building, which he, according to Sophie Dorothea Zinn's memoirs, refurbished in 1793 with all British interiors. In 1798, Christmas bought a newly constructed property at the corner of Rådhusstræde and Brolæggerstræde from Andreas Hallander. He lived there with his new wife and family-in-law. In 1801, he sold it to his father-in-law. He had already in 1800 bought the Barchmann Mansion at the corner of Frederiksholms Kanal and Ny Kongensgade. He sold it in 1804. Between 1804 and 1810, Christmas is not registered at an address in Copenhagen, but is recorded as having been at his country house Høveltegaard during this time. He owned Høveltegaard from 1799–1814 and again from 1820 until his death. In 1810 he purchased the property at Store Kongensgade 62 and resided there until his death. He also purchased the country house Rolighed in 1813, which passed on to his daughter and son-in-law Duntzfelt after his death.

Gyldensteen’s Gaard, a beautiful house at the corner of Bredgade and Dronningens Tværgade, which has since been completely rebuilt into the Phoenix Hotel, was incorrectly identified as John’s house in the early 1790s in a publisher’s footnote in Sophie Dorothea Zinn’s memoirs. In fact, John owned the house for less than a year from 1809-1810 and was never registered as living there.
