= HDMS Havfruen (1825) =

Frigate of the Royal Danish Navy

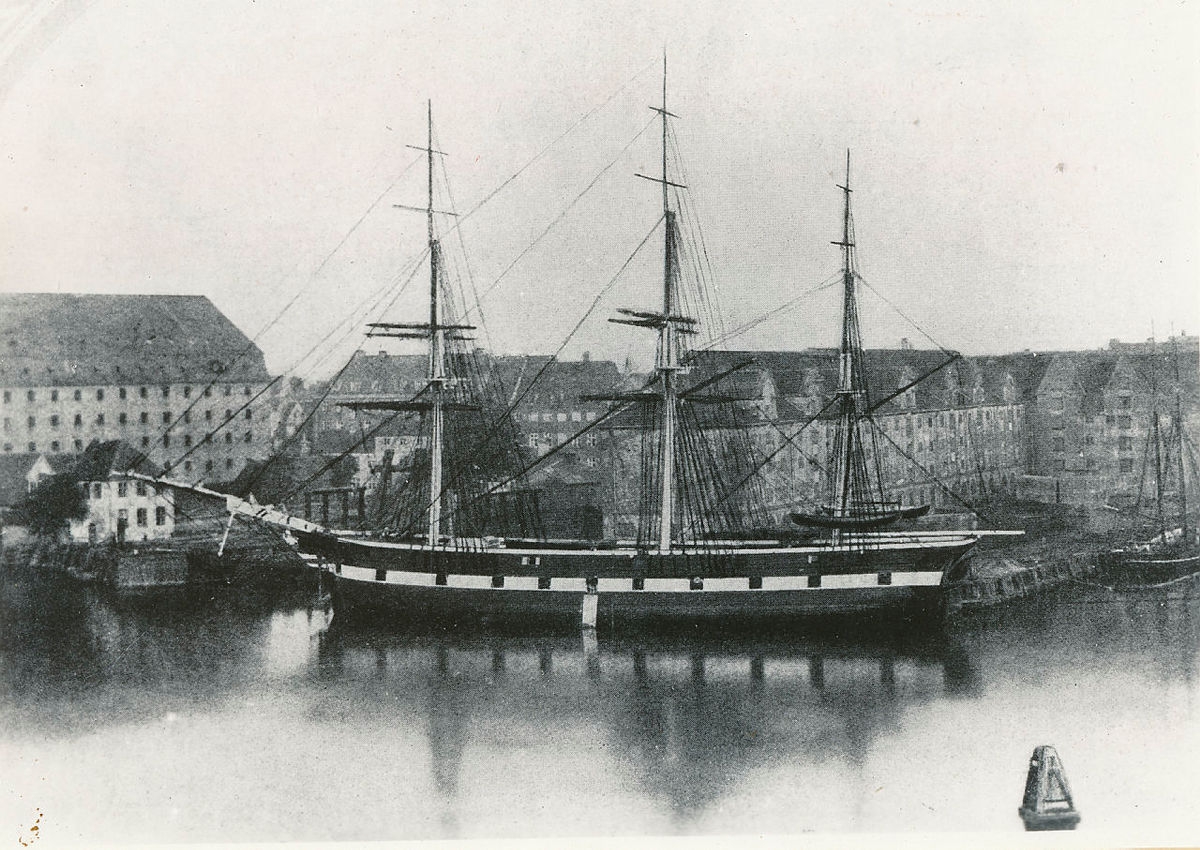
- Havfruen docked at Christianshavn, Copenhagen.

History

Denmark
- Name: Havfruen
- Owner: Royal Danish Navy
- Builder: Royal Danish Naval Dockyard
- Launched: 5 October 1825
- Commissioned: 1832
- Fate: Sold in auction

Denmark
- Name: Havfruen
- Owner: Det Kjøbenhavnske Skibsrhederi
- Acquired: 13 March 1865
- Fate: Sold

Sweden
- Name: Havfruen
- Owner: Johan Ingemanson
- Acquired: 27 March 1882
- Fate: Wrecked 1882

General characteristics
- Class & type: Frigate
- Length: 48.09 m
- Armament: In Danish service: 46 x 16-pounder guns

HDMS Havfruen was a frigate of the Royal Danish Navy.

== Construction ==
HDMS Havfruen was built at the Royal Dock Yard in Copenhagen to a design by Andreas Schifter. She was launched on 6 October 1825.

She was one of four frigates in the same class. The others were HDMS Freya (1824-1853), HDMS Bellona (1830) (1835-1862) and HDMS Rota (1822) (1838-1863).

== Royal Danish Navy service ==
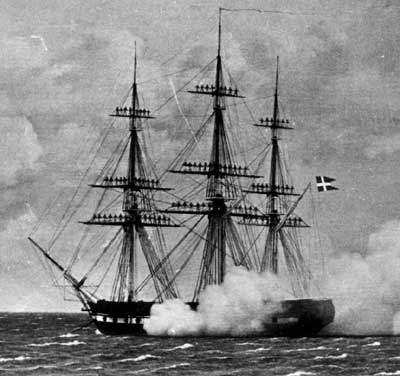
HDMS Havfruen

She served the Royal Danish Navy from 6 October 1825. She was under command of captain C. Lütken and accompanied by HDMS Nymfen from 28 April 1832 to 22 June 1832

Later captains were J. R. Petersen (26 April 1848 – 18 August 1848), Jihn Christmas (18 August 1848 - 14 October 1848), J. R. Petersen (17 March 1849 – 28 September 1849) and J. A. Meyer (24 May 1850 – 18 October 1850).

She was used as a naval training ship from 1 May 1853 to 1 October 1853. She was under command of captain Peter Frederik Wulff from 1 June 1853 to 7 October 1853 and then

From 1 October 1853 she was used as an accommodation ship under the command of Captain-Lieutenant E. W. Holst and again in 1854 and 1856.

== Civilian service ==
She was decommissioned from the navy on 5 September 1864. On 13 March 1865, she was sold in auction at the Royal Dockyard. The buyer was Det Kjøbenhavnske Skibsrhederi, a subsidiary of H. Puggaard & Co. She was adapted for use as a merchant ship under the supervision of P. Brandt at the Royal Naval Dockyard in 1865–1866.

In her time as a merchant ship, Havfruen was commanded by captain J.P. Sørensen, captain A.F. Andrea, captain J.C. Trolle and captain A.J. Bang (1880-1881).

On 27 March 1882, she was sold to Johan Ingemanson, Elleholm, Blekinge, Sweden, with captain Daniel Petterson as partner. She wrecked in 1882 at Griffin Cove, Gaspe, Canada.
