= Walter Christmas =

Danish author (1861–1924)

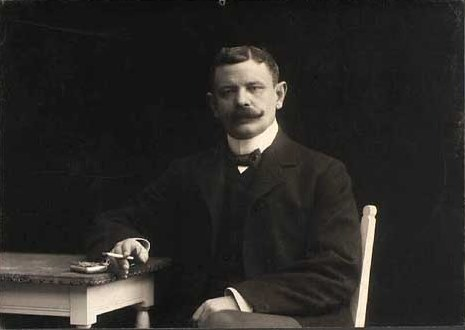
- Walter Christmas in 1902
- Born: Walter Christmas-Dircknick-Holmfeld; February 10, 1861; Jægersborg, Denmark
- Died: March 18, 1924 (aged 63); Copenhagen, Denmark
- Burial place: Garrison Cemetery, Copenhagen
- Citizenship: Denmark
- Occupation: Author
- Awards: Order of the Dannebrog
- Espionage activity
- Agency: MI6

Walter Christmas-Dirckinck-Holmfeld (10 February 1861–18 March 1924), commonly known as Walter Christmas or Captain Christmas, was a Danish author, naval officer, diplomat, and spy for MI6. Today, he is best known for his children's books. He also wrote novels, nonfictional accounts, and theatrical works. Many of his early works were inspired by his experiences traveling as a naval officer.

He began an extensive military career at the age of 14, serving in the Danish Navy, then later the Royal Thai Navy and the Greek Navy. While stationed in Siam he was involved in the Paknam incident wherein he disobeyed the orders of his commander, Andreas du Plessis de Richelieu. He was discharged as a result. He then served in the Greek Navy before returning to the Danish Navy in 1914. In 1916, he was again forced to resign following the revelation of his collusion with MI6.

Alongside his military career, Christmas was involved in several attempts to sell the Danish West Indies to various nations. His efforts were ultimately unsuccessful and resulted in a congressional investigation into claims that he attempted to bribe members of the United States government. When the islands were later sold in 1916, he was decorated as a member of the Order of the Dannebrog for his earlier diplomatic efforts.

== Personal life ==
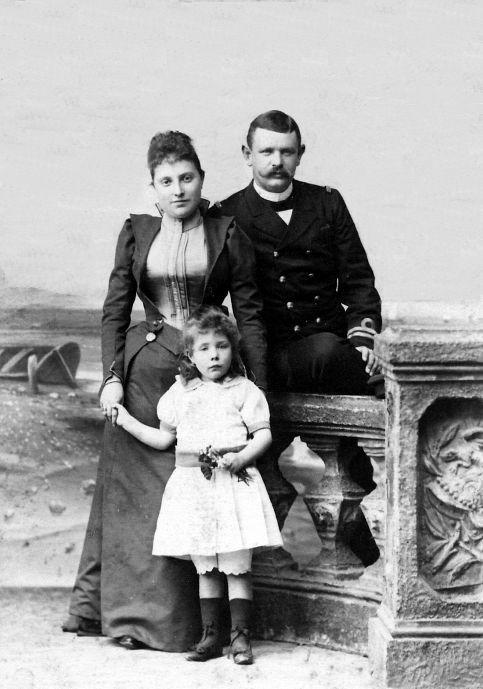
Christmas with his wife Ragnhild Jutta Weber and daughter Aja, c. 1890.

Walter Dirckinck-Holmfeld-Christmas was born 10 February 1861, in Jægersborg, Denmark. His mother, Tusky Susanne Charlotte Dirckinck-Holmfeld (1839–1924), was born a baronesse of the Dirckinck-Holmfeld noble family and was of Dutch descent. His father, Walter Edmund Christmas (1834–1916), was of English descent through his grandfather, Captain John Christmas Smith. Walter Edmund was a chamberlain, hofjægermester, and lieutenant colonel. He was decorated as a Knight of the Danneborg, a member of the Legion of Honour, the Order of St. Stanislaus, and the Order of the Sword. In 1880, Walter Edmund was granted the right to adopt his wife's noble name, thus creating the Christmas-Dirckinck-Holmfeld family. The family had their own coat of arms in the Danish noble family register which combined those of the Christmas and Dirckinck-Holmfeld families. Walter Christmas was one of the family's six children, along with: John Carl Constant Beresford (b. 1860), Tusky Sophie Malvina Mary (b. 1862), Selma Johanne (b. 1865), Edward (b. 1867), and Ellen (b. 1868).

On 29 July 1886, Christmas married Ragnhild Jutta Aja Weber. She was the daughter of wholesale merchant Theobald Weber and Sophie Emilie Meldola. Walter and Ragnhild took several trips to the West Indies and South America during their marriage. The couple divorced on 7 February 1898, and he was remarried to Ellen Margrethe Vilhelmine Margrethe Hansen on 8 August 1898. Ellen had divorced her first husband, a merchant in Berlin named Alexander Cunliffe Owen, on the same day as Walter's divorce: 7 February 1898. Ellen was born in 1872 and was the adoptive daughter of the merchant Ludvig Marcus Adolph Hansen and Kirstine Thorsen.

Christmas had two daughters. Aja Sigrid Ellen was born on 12 April 1889. Vera Tusky was born 13 July 1898. He died 18 March 1924, in Copenhagen and is buried at Garrison Cemetery.

== Military career ==
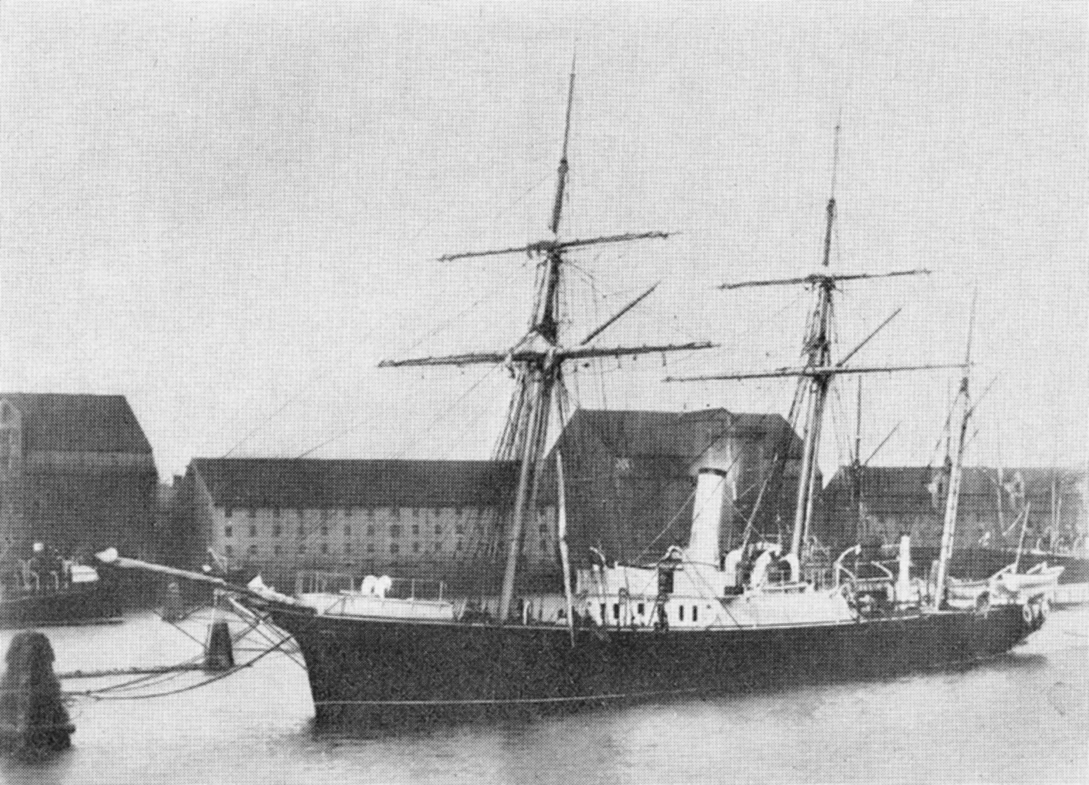
The HDMS Fylla in Copenhagen, 1888.

Christmas joined the Danish navy as a cadet at the age of 14. In 1883, he was appointed as a lieutenant, and the next year he was promoted to the rank of second lieutenant. In 1885, Christmas was a member of J.A.D. Jensen's expedition to Greenland on board the steam gunboat Fylla. In 1890 he traveled along the Amazon River with the intention of establishing a Danish shipping route. However, he was unable to find an investor in his project and the route was instead taken over by German shipowners.

He again left Denmark in 1891 and traveled to Thailand, then the Rattanakosin Kingdom, where he was a commander in the Siam Navy on behalf of the Danish navy. While the Danish crown was actively supporting the government of Siam, they were unwilling to be involved in a war with France to defend the nation. As such, Christmas in particular received a telegram from the Danish Ministry of the Interior that if he engaged in combat he would be discharged from the navy. He was the only Danish officer in Siam to receive such a warning. The navy eventually became involved in the Franco-Siamese conflict of 1893, under Andreas du Plessis de Richelieu. While under Richelieu's command, Christmas fought against the French navy during the Paknam incident. At the time, he was in command of a gunboat stationed close to the Paknam fort. During the incident he hit the forship of the pilot steamboat, which then began to sink before being run aground.

As a result of his engagement in the conflict, Christmas was discharged from the navy and recalled to Denmark. In his defence, he sent the ministry of the Danish Navy a report containing "some minor criticisms" of their presence in Siam. This report was then widely distributed to the public in a 1893 publication of Nationaltidende. The report argued that although there had been armed conflict, the Paknam incident did not constitute a war, and thus he had not disobeyed his orders. There is speculation that several other criticisms of the Navy in Siam were also written by Christmas. His book about his experience, A year in Siam, was published after his return to Denmark in 1894.

Christmas resigned from the Danish navy in 1894. After being discharged, he joined the Greek Navy in 1895. While enlisted, he was involved in the Greco-Turkish War of 1897. He left the Greek Navy and returned to Denmark in 1897. He rejoined the Danish Navy in 1914 at the rank of captain. He was again forced to resign in 1916, reportedly because of complications with severe rheumatism. However, his resignation coincided with the revelation of his collaboration with MI6 while stationed in Skagen, and is likely the primary reason for his departure from the navy. That same year he was inducted as a member of the Order of the Dannebrog.

== Diplomacy ==
Beginning in 1896, Christmas was involved in several ill-fated attempts to sell the Danish West Indies. He had a familiarity with the islands through his grandfather, John Christmas, who had been governor-general of the Danish West Indies during 1871. Christmas unsuccessfully attempted to sell the Islands to Germany in collaboration with Rear Admiral Paul Zirzow in December 1898.

He was later in contact with U.S. Secretary of State John Hay and President William McKinley as part of long standing negotiations to sell the islands to the United States. Christmas was again unsuccessful, and he was later accused of attempting to bribe several congressmen and other U.S. officials with up to $500,000 to facilitate the purchase. These allegations against him arose from the financial gains he stood to make from a successful deal between the nations, as he had expected a commission of 10% on the sale price. In 1902, the U.S. House Of Representatives voted unanimously to investigate these claims, and a committee was appointed by the Speaker of the House which held several hearings. He was ultimately acquitted, and no charges were made against the officials who had allegedly taken bribes.

An agreement between the United States and Denmark was reached in 1916, and the U.S. Virgin Islands officially became part of the country in 1917. Christmas was decorated as a member of the Order of the Dannebrog in 1916, apparently for his diplomatic efforts.

== Espionage ==
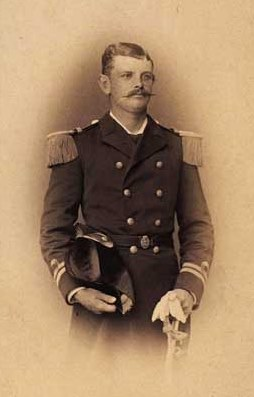
Christmas before 1900, photographed by Frederikke Eckardt

For an undisclosed period of time, Christmas was an agent for the British Intelligence Service under the direction of Mansfield Cumming. The full extent of his activity as an agent is unknown. Reports from MI6 verify that he had been an intelligence agent while serving in the Danish navy. Records from other agents also place Christmas in Greece during the assassination of King George I of Greece. While in Greece during the late 1890s, Christmas claims to have been in close contact with King George I, about whom he wrote the biography King George of Greece (Danish: Kong Georg I, Prins af Danmark). According to Christmas, the King's final words were "Thank God, Christmas can now finish his work with a chapter to the glory of Greece, of the Crown Prince and of the Army." This was apparently in reference to Christmas' work as the King's personal biographer. The head of the MI6 station in Athens, Compton Mackenzie, wrote in his memoir Greek Memories of his encounters with Christmas:

"...a fantastic half-pay Danish sea-captain turned up in Athens with credentials from Alexandria. I was instructed to give him every facility to look round and also to let him send telegrams in our cipher under the name of Brutus. His real name was Christmas! He actually secured an audience of the King and immediately afterwards telegraphed to London a ridiculous account of the situation in Athens which I, who was not allowed to communicate directly with London, could only counter by a telegram of protest to Alexandria. On top of this he discovered all by himself a supposed submarine base at Laurium, and once again this wretched nonsense was disseminated in telegrams. Finally Sir Francis protested against this irresponsible old man of the sea’s sojourn any longer in Athens at the expense of the British Government, and he wandered off again. To look back after twenty-three years at Captain Christmas is to make me as sceptical of his real existence as of the existence of Santa Claus. Indeed, if I did not possess references to him in letters I should fancy that I had read about him in Hans Andersen’s fairy tales."

Christmas had been the Naval officer overseeing operations at the northernmost point of mainland Denmark, Skagen, from 1914 until 1916. During this period, he forwarded all of the "coast-watching reports" that his command produced to MI6 through Copenhagen. According to MI6 records, he was one of many such "coast-watchers." These agents had been stationed on the coasts of Jutland with the intention of monitoring the movement of German war vessels before and during World War I. They were deliberately unaware of each other so that their reports could be used to verify one another once gathered by the Head Office in London. At his request, a "pretty girl" was always available at the local hotel to act as his intermediary. One of these women unintentionally revealed his scheme in late 1915. As a result, he was forced to flee to London.

== Authorship ==
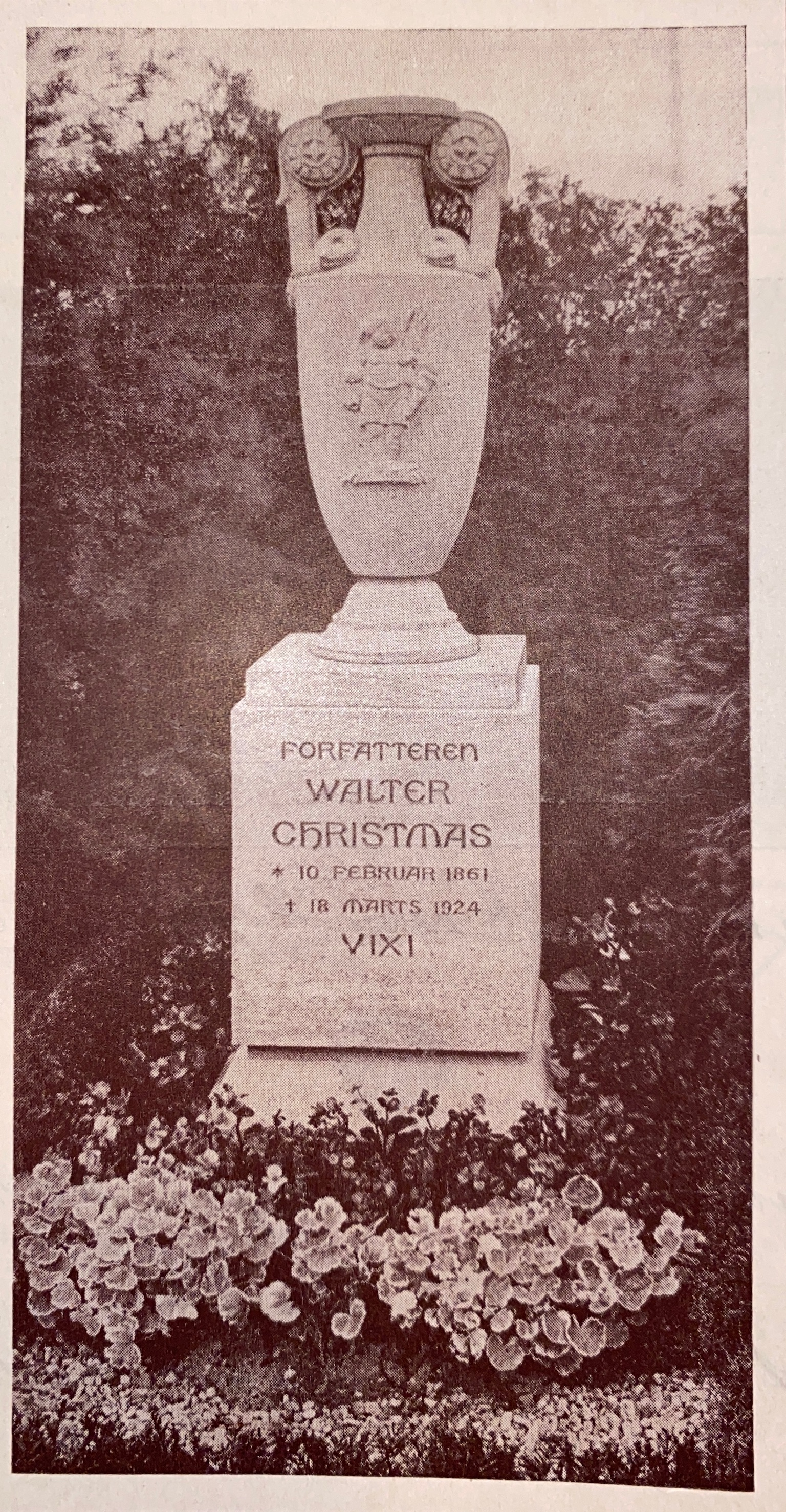
Christmas' headstone in Garrison Cemetery, Copenhagen which describes him as "the author Walter Christmas".

Walter Christmas published approximately 30 plays, novels, and short-stories in addition to a biography and series of memoirs. He published his first book in 1892 while in Thailand, titled Amazonfloden, erindringer og skildringer (English: Amazon River, memories and depictions) about his journey on the Amazon river.

Christmas's book about his experience of the Paknam incident, A year in Siam (Danish: Et år i Siam), was published in 1894. Its contents were explicitly critical of Admiral Richelieu's command, as well as Hans Niels Andersen's business in Bangkok. Richelieu was greatly offended by Christmas' statements, and sought to file a lawsuit against him in Copenhagen for libel. Through close contacts, Richelieu then began publishing criticism of Christmas in the English-language press in Bangkok. These were soon translated and circulated in the Danish press. Christmas eventually filed a lawsuit against the editor which had published the articles in Bangkok. The case was settled three and a half years later, after 37 court hearings. Although Et År i Siam initially received negative reviews, the publicity which Richelieu unintentionally gave Christmas by persistently disparaging the text in the press maintained public interest in the book and increased sales.

In 1901, Christmas released the first of five books about his character Peder Most, a young boy from Svendborg who embarks on worldly adventures. The resulting series became one of his most profitable successes. Though the books were very popular at the time they were released, they have since been criticized for their use of derogatory terms, ethnic slurs, and exoticism.

Christmas is credited with popularizing Arthur Conan Doyle's Sherlock Holmes in Denmark. He had seen William Gillette's production Sherlock Holmes several times in 1899 while attempting to sell the Danish West Indies to the United States. He took extensive notes on Gillette's production which he then largely copied and reproduced in Denmark under the same title. Christmas' production of Sherlock Holmes debuted in 1901 in Copenhagen and was soon taken up by traveling acts which toured Denmark for several years. These traveling acts paid him for performance rights, despite the reality that the play was a copy of Gillette's, for which Christmas never gave him credit. Danish intellectual property laws of the time initially took no issue with this obvious case of piracy, though by 1903 Denmark had signed the Berne Convention and Christmas was forced to become more cautious.

Christmas was a member of the Danish Writers Guild's board of directors. Two of his original plays have been performed at the Royal Danish Theatre: "Skærsild" from 1906 and "Lige for Lige" from 1923. In 1909 and 1910 Christmas was the director of Dagmarteatret, a theatre in Copenhagen. Under his direction the theatre came into conflict with the press over whether or not they should be allowed to photograph and print images of the theatre's productions. In retaliation, all reviews of the theatre's productions were halted in all Copenhagen news publications. This conflict with the press and its resulting financial difficulties led to Christmas' resignation.

== Selected bibliography ==
All of Christmas' works were originally published by Gyldendal, with the exception of Fejl Kurs, a novel manuscript which was posthumously published by Hasselbalchs Forlag. The works are listed below.

- Amazonfloden, Erindringer og skildringer, 1892
- Et Aar i Siam, 1894
- Maïma: Novellistiske Forsøg, 1895
- Kærlighedens ret, 1895
- Sherlock Holmes, 1901
- Peder Most, 1901
- Frits Banner, 1902
- Fremtidslande, 1903
- Styrmand Most, (Peder Most series) 1903
- Kong Peder, (Peder Most series) 1904
- En lektion: Komedie i fire Akter, 1905
- På Livet løs, (Peder Most series) 1906
- Skærsild: Skuespile i fire Akter 1906
- Smaa Helte, 1907
- Guldminen Malibran, 1908
- Rivaler: Lystspil i fire Akter, 1908
- Eventyrblomstren, 1909
- Millionærdrengen, 1909
- Under Tropesol, 1909
- Svend Spejder, 1911
- Karusellen, 1912
- Annelise, 1912
- King George of Greece (Danish: Kong Georg I, Prins af Danmark) 1913
- Dødningehovedet, 1915
- Peder Most paa Krigsstien, (Peder Most series) 1921
- Krydstogt gennem livet: Vimplen hejst, 1923
- Krydstogt gennem livet: Med skum om Bov!, 1923
- Fejl Kurs, 1927
