= Johan Friedrich Heinrich =

Danish colonial administrator

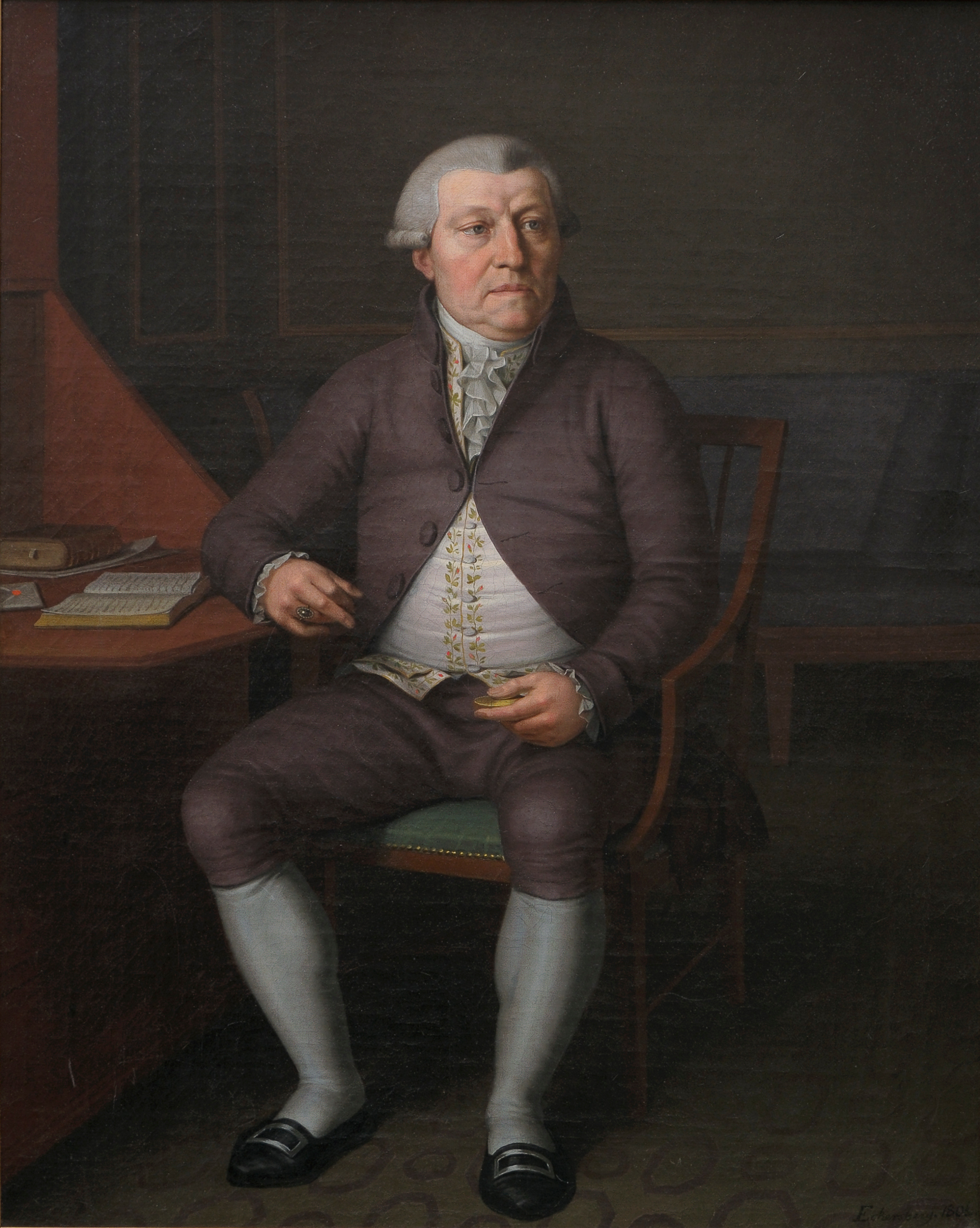
Johan Friedrich Heinrich painted by C. W. Eckersberg.

Johan Friedrich (Frederik) Heinrich (1730 – 24 March 1808) was a German-Danish medical doctor, colonial administrator and landowner. He served as director of the Danish West India and Guinea Trade from 1779.

== Early life and education ==
Heinrich was born in Roxheim to Johann Casimir Heinrich (1707–1752) and Apollonia Heinrich (1707–1772).

== Career ==
From 1757 to 1769, Heinrich served as regiment surgeon and hospital physician on Saint Croix in the Danish West Indies. He was also associated with the royal plantations and naval ships. In 1771, he was appointed as kommerceintendant and member of the Government Council of the Danish West Indies and of the Secretary Council (det sekrete råd) of St. Croix and St. Thomas. In 1779, he was appointed as director of the Danish West India and Guinea Trade. He acquired the title of justitsråd in 1776, etatsråd in 1777 and konferensråd in 1784. 1785 saw him appointed as Chief Commercial Officer (handelskynding direktør) of the Danish West India Company. In 1788, he was appointed as one of the directors of the vestindiske gælds likvidation. He acquired the rank of Major-General in 1789.

== Personal life ==
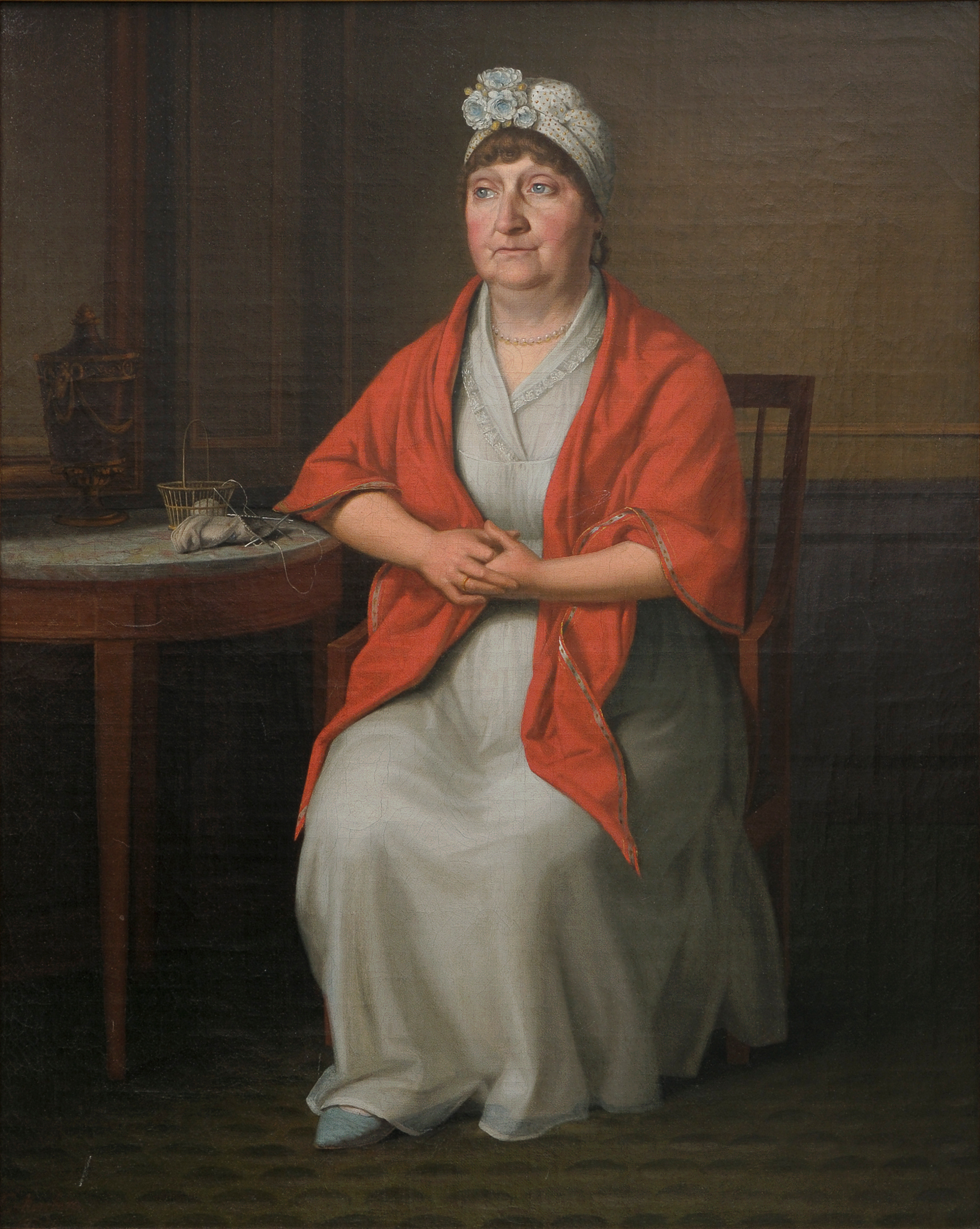
Bertha Heinrich.

Heinrich was married to Bertha van Lexmond (1738–1811). The couple had six daughters and one son. Christoffer Wilhelm Eckersberg has painted a pair of full-length portrait paintings of Heinrich and his wife. Heinrich acquired Sparresholm Manor at Næstved in 1789. In 1799, he sold the estate to Charles August Selby.

One of Heinrich's daughters, Frederikke Sophie Heinrich (1764–1807), was first married to Henrik von Bolten, and then to count Frederik Christopher Trampe, but both marriages ended in separation. Another daughter, Johanne Marie "Hanne" Heinrich (1771-1808) was married to, and eventually separated from, sea captain and general trader John Christmas. The daughters, Johanne Henriette Heinrich (1776-1802) and Anna Elisabeth "Betty" Heinrich (1782-1826) both married Christmas' business partner Thomas ter Broch.

Heinrich and his wife resided in an apartment at Rådhusstræde 1 at the time of the 1801 census. They lived there with their three youngest children. The building belonged to their son-in-law, John Christmas. Heinrich's eldest daughter, Frideriche Sophie Heinrich, resided in another apartment with her two sons (aged two and three), a nanny, two female cooks and a female assistant cook. Her husband, Frederik Christopher, Count Trampe, is not mentioned as a member of the household. The couple was thus apparently not living together at this point. The marriage was dissolved on 1 November 1803. Politician Christian Colbjørnsen resided in another apartment.
