= Wurmbrand =

Origin
- Language: German
- Meaning: 1. "worm/dragon - fire" 2. (Jewish surname) Yiddish dialect of "Warmbrand" warm - fire
- Region of origin: Germany, Poland

Other names
- Variant forms: Wurm (disambiguation), Lindwurm; Wurmer, Wurmberg, Wurmann (Wurman); Warm (disambiguation), Warmer (disambiguation), Wärmer, Warmberg (or may Wahrenberg), Warmann (or may Wahrmann); Drach, Drache (disambiguation), Drachmann

Wurmbrand is surname of:

- Count Wurmbrand-Stuppach, an old noble family of Austria

- Melchior Freiherr von Wurmbrand(-Stuppach) (1475–1553), businessman and military man
- Johann Wilhelm Graf von Wurmbrand (1670–1750), statesman and historian
- Adelma Vay, née Wurmbrand-Stuppach (1840–1925), medium and pioneer and spirituality
- Countess Stephanie von Wurmbrand-Stuppach (1849–1919), Hungarian pianist and composer
- Countess Maria Anna Paula Ferdinandine von Wurmbrand-Stuppach (1914–2003), Austro-Hungarian countess, huntress, racehorse owner and socialite

- Richard Wurmbrand (1909–2001), Romanian evangelical Christian minister and author

== See also ==
- also Wurmbrand is a Katastralgemeinde in Lower Austria
