= Skamlingsbanken =

Hill in Jutland, Denmark

Coordinates: 55°25′07″N 9°33′56″E

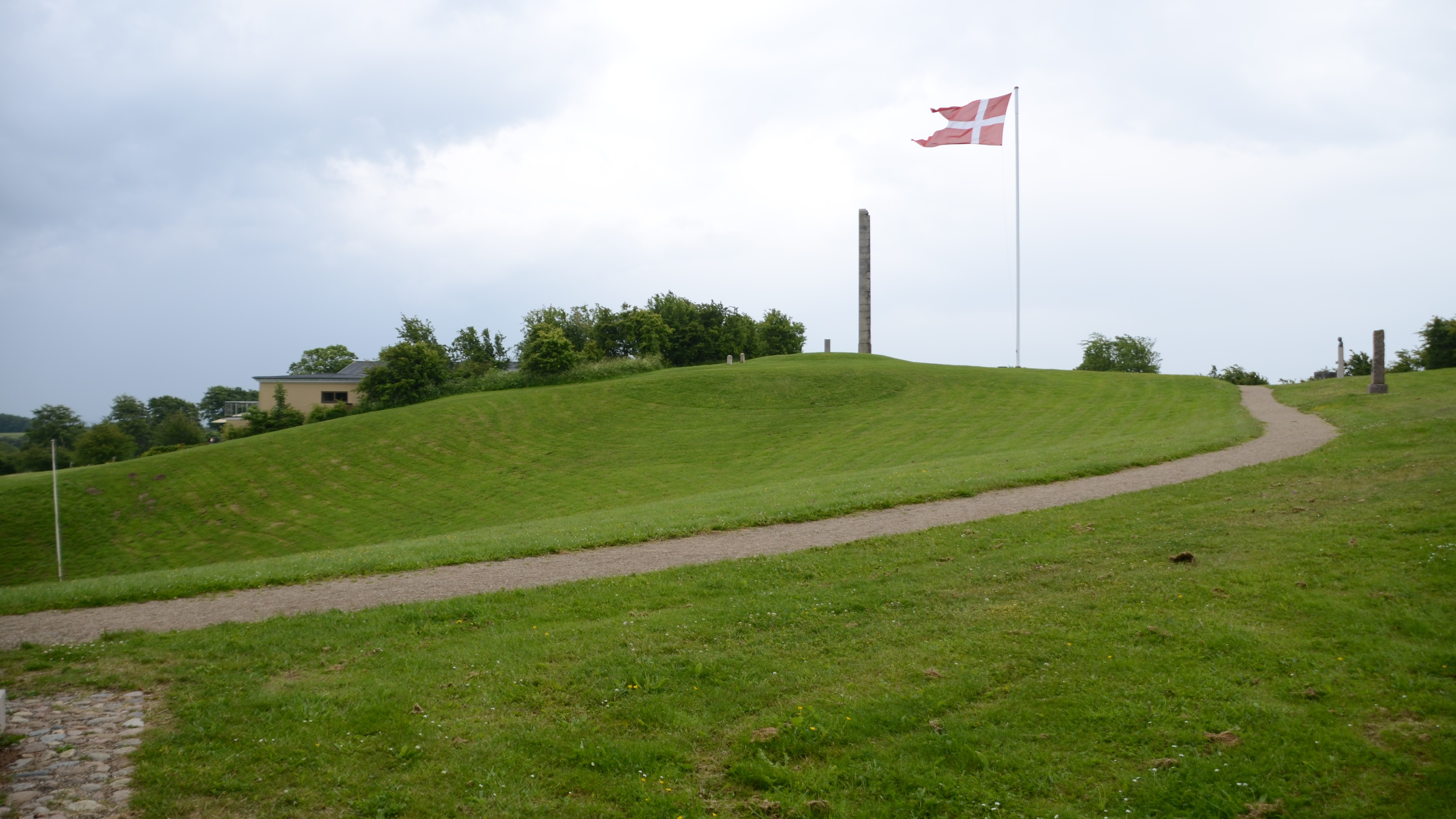
- Højskamling in 2024.

Highest point
- Elevation: 113 m (371 ft)

Geography
- Location within Denmark
- Location: Vejstrup Parish, Denmark

Skamlingsbanken is a large hill located in Vejstrup Parish, Jutland, Denmark, between Kolding and Christiansfeld. With a peak rising to 113 metres (371 ft) above sea level, it is the highest point in Southern Jutland.

The bank of the hill is 2 to 3 kilometres (1.2 to 1.9 mi) long and was created during the ice age with clay pushed up the Little Belt Strait from a nearby glacier. Several major historic public meetings took place here during and after the disputes over the territory of Schleswig-Holstein. When peace returned, there was an exchange of territories between the kingdom and the Duchy of Southern Jutland. As a result, eight non-Jutland parishes in the northern part of Tyrstrup Herred, including Vejstrup Parish, were transferred to the kingdom and Skamlingsbanken thereafter fell within the borders of Denmark.

== Geology ==
Skamlingsbanken is a lateral moraine formed at the beginning of the Wisconsin glaciation period, approximately 22,000–25,000 years ago, although other glaciers came through later from the east and south, forming Skamlingsbanken and the large hills and rugged terrain south of Kolding. From Højskamling the landscape falls steeply eastwards and ends up in a cove at Mosvig. To the west, the landscape drops to a level height of around 60 metres (200 ft) above sea level and continues all the way to the Jutland ridgeway.

== Flora ==
The area has been covered in largely beech forest for centuries, leading to the development of a rich flora. Botanically similar to South Jutland, common plants in the area between Skamlingsbanken and Grønninghoved include wax hat, low thistle and hawthorn. As a result of cattle grazing, growth on the lower part of the hill is kept in check but the top grows wild. Some areas are left to nature allowing blackthorn, hawthorn, roses, elder and other scrub growth to flourish, while other areas are maintained in order to preserve the fragile natural grasslands. The whole area is protected by the Danish Nature Conservation Act.

== History ==
=== Early history ===
During the 16th century, Skamlingsbanken belonged to Frederick II of Denmark as part of his hunting ground, which stretched all the way to Vejle. The area remained under crown ownership for many years, but in 1764 the monarch began to sell various areas. One area, Grønninghoved Strandskov, remained under crown ownership and is currently state forest. Over many centuries, cultural historical sites such as mounds, depressions and dykes have developed in the wild forest.

=== 1840s National Skamlingsbakke Meetings ===
After the crisis in 19th–century Schleswig-Holstein, a desire to retain and strengthen the Danish spirit and the Danish language in South Jutland arose. A meeting in Stændersalen, Rendsburg in December 1842, caused a great stir when grocer Peter Hiort Lorenzen from Haderslev, then Nis Lorenzen, Lilholt and Posselt from Københoved, spoke Danish. The Germans regarded this as an insult, while Danish-minded Schleswigers saw it as a patriotic victory to be celebrated. This resulted in a celebration held on 21 February 1843 at an inn in Sommersted where farmer Laurids Skau gave a speech and ended with the words;

"Like our ancestors, we empty a cup of oath. We will not promise so much, that we will turn our backs to German officials, who speak German to us, nor that we within three years will hunt Duke of Nordalbingia out of the country, but we will promise and keep – within three years to gather to feast again."

Whereupon Hans Ivar Staal shouted, "We will meet within three months." He went on to explain that the patriotic men of his district had decided to celebrate on 14 May, to commemorate the royal decree introducing the Danish language in a number of public offices. They chose Skamlingsbanken where they had secured a place to gather. The surprised and enthusiastic participants immediately created a committee which would collect the 440 silver Thaler required to purchase the hill, which was raised within a few weeks. Skamlingsbanken then officially came under the association's ownership in 1854, following confirmation by the king's signature.

A number of other languages meetings then followed, which later evolved into folk festivals and national meetings. The first was held on 18 May 1843 instead of 14 May, since this was a Sunday and would have conflicted with the holiday law. Beginning at sunrise the participants hoisted the Dannebrog, a huge split flag 12 Ell long and 6 ell wide (7.68 by 3.84 metres (25.2 by 12.6 ft)). At 11 o'clock Højskamling was inaugurated and Laurids Skau became the first speaker. Drewsen spoke next and handed over a silver drinking horn to P. Hiort Lorenzen. It was made of Danish silver pieces and bore the inscription, "He spoke Danish, and continued to speak Danish." Later on, the Højskamlings banner was consecrated, with a speech by teacher A. C. Abbey from Moltrup and the rest of the day continued with songs, music, disc shooting and dancing. The celebrations ended at nightfall with bonfires and singing.

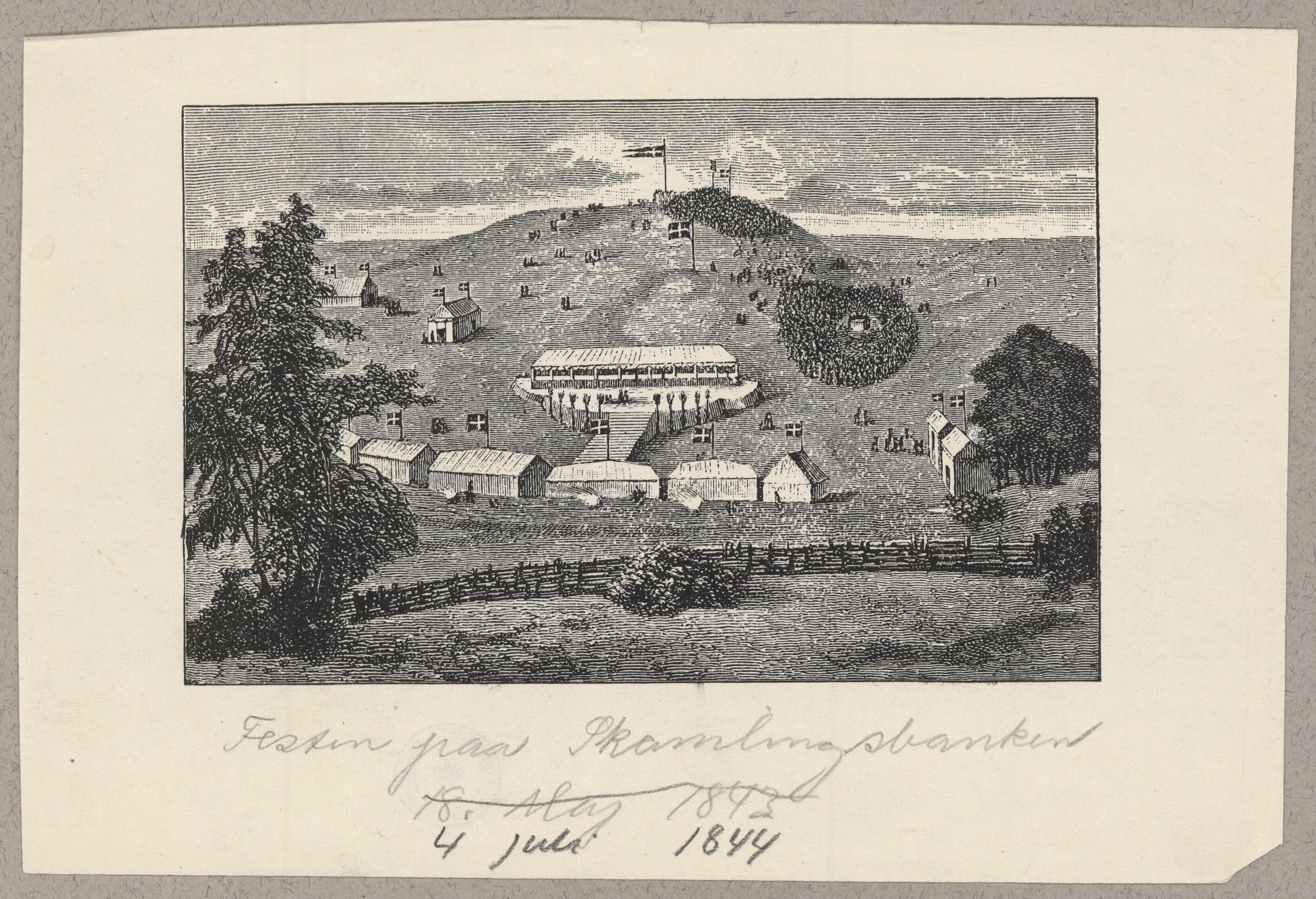
Illustration of the 1844 National Language Meeting.

The second meeting on 4 July 1844 was a protest meeting over the King's degradation of the Danish language's influence in the charter of 29 March 1844. This meeting had native language conservation as its key theme which applied to all of the Nordic countries. The previous evening, a steamer with 120 citizens from Copenhagen arrived, including N. F. S. Grundtvig, Orla Lehmann, Carl Ploug and Meïr Aron Goldschmidt. The huge party began at sunrise with hoisting of the flag accompanied by cannon salutes. Then, after Kaj Hansen from Vonsild had welcomed everyone, Laurids Skau made a speech. Carl Ploug was in the audience and it is probably this speech he refers to when he later writes about the peasant who says:

... from South Jutland High,
thousands listened, staring
as scintillating starlight thoughts flew,
as words rattled like swords.

The next speaker was N. F. S. Grundtvig, who ended his speech with a prophecy:

Northern Schleswig-Holstein inhabitants continued to speak Danish, it must be after centuries of history, the main abstracts of your giant story.

Hiort Lorenzen then walked on to the podium, to talk about the United States Declaration of Independence as he had chosen 4 July as the date for this Skamlingsbanken Meeting. Orla Lehmann followed on and promised the inhabitants of South Jutland to stand with them through thick and thin. Professor C. Paulsen then spoke, saying, "a people are only lost when it denies itself self." After lunch, Carl Ploug addressed the meeting claiming that North Schleswig had the backing not only of the Danish people but the whole of Scandinavia. Kloster, a teacher from Sommersted also took the podium and after him came Meïr Aron Goldschmidt, editor of The Corsair. who said:

I am your brother. Here is my hand. May it write for you? can it hit for you? So command!

This celebration ended with a giant bonfire consisting of three or four trees and some tar barrels.

The third meeting was also a protest meeting. On 18 July 1845 it drew 8,000 people with a large contingent from Norway and Sweden. Among the speakers was Laurids Skau, Steen Steensen Blicher Frederik Barfod and Carl Ploug, whose speech was suppressed by censors in Denmark, but was reported in Swedish magazines.

The fourth meeting opened with a mood of happy expectation, since an open royal letter dated 8 July 1846, laid out Denmark's claim to the whole of Schleswig. Carl Ploug spoke at this meeting and once again the speech was censored.

On 28 June 1847, the fifth meeting took place when Laurids Skau was pleased to report on the establishment of a Danish teacher training college and that the German high school in Haderslev, would henceforth teach in Danish. Master Helweg from the folk high school in Rødding then took the podium and pupils from the entire school sang. There were almost as many people present as there had been at the 1844 protest meeting.

This proved to be the last language festival due to the start of the First Schleswig War.

=== Later meetings, 1850–1900 ===
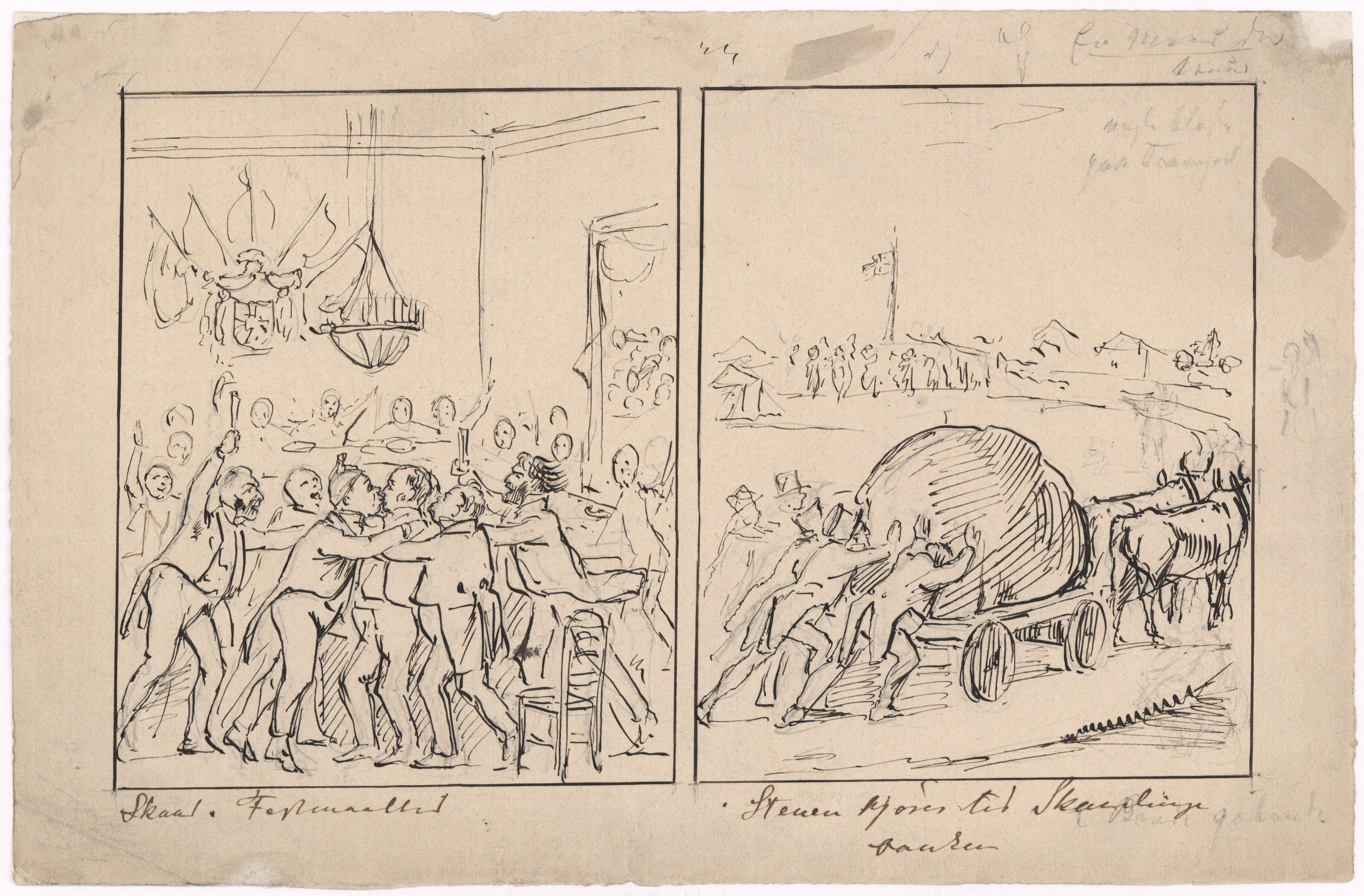
Illustration by P. C. Klæstrup: Preparations for one of the Skamlingsbanken events.ulder at Skamlingsbanken.

During the 1850s a number of folk festivals took place, with the first in 1851 and the last in 1859. However, these saw fewer participants, because the main theme of the Danish language had declined in importance. Several language charters had been introduced during this period, while Danish had also become the language of schools in some parts of south Jutland.

People continued to hold meetings and parties at Skamlingsbanken on different occasions and a small cafe was built in 1868 to accommodate the numerous visitors. In 1883, a large meeting of Nordic folk high school principals and high school teachers took place.

=== 20th century ===
In the years around 1900 many people celebrated with lectures on Midsummer day. On 4 June 1906 the poet Bjørnstjerne Bjørnson spoke in front of 10,000 people at Højskamling saying:

I have often seen that the circle of vision, was edged by high mountains and the sea, but I have never before seen thousands of people to the edges.

Following World War I and before the official 1920 reunification of Denmark and Schleswig, a great country reunion party was held on Sunday 13 July 1919. All the choirs in Denmark showed up at the event which attracted up to 15,000 visitors. Magister Viggo Bierring first welcomed everybody, then Professor Ellinger celebrated the fallen of the war, whereupon everyone stood up and bared their heads while the royal conductor Georg Høeberg performed Jutland between two seas. Later, his brother, royal chamber singer Albert Høeberg, sang From distant countries came Queen Dagmar. The Danish atmosphere was maintained by Tenna Frederiksen, who sang I went out one summer's day and Drachmanns song about the girls of South Jutland. There was huge applause when the South Jutland choir under the photographer Gaasvig, sang several different songs from the local countryside. Despite several showers of rain throughout the day, the festival ended in high spirits with all attendees singing King of Kings. The event was subsequently held several more times, but none surpassed this festivity.

One week after the reunion celebration, Danish youth associations held their annual rally on Skamlingsbanken where Jacob Appel Kloppenborg-Skrumsager and Bishop Ludwig discussed church affairs. The Danish Mission Society held their annual mission meeting in subsequent years at Skamlingsbanken on Danish Constitution Day.

The Young Border Guard, founded in 1934, chose to hold their first annual meeting at Skamlingsbanken, which broke all visitor records. In addition to those carrying the 25,000 passes issued, another 5–10,000 people turned up without one. Extra trains, each with 15 carriages, were laid on to cope with the large gathering of people while additional steamers operated at full speed. The day began with a rendition of Kongesangen, with everyone standing, then later Der er et yndigt land was sung and everyone bared their head.

The annual meeting was opened by Skamlingsbanken Company President, O. Juhl and conducted by director Hammerich Tønder. Danish people from across Jutland joined in a circle to sing under the direction of Professor Ottosen Haderslev. After a speech from the president of the border guard union, teacher Peter Marcussen from Tønder, joined H. P. Hansen at the podium and received long applause. He talked about the past history of Skamlingsbanken meetings and quoted Laurids Skau's words;

It is lions, and not monkeys that are jumping to take up Danish arms.

He continued saying:

When I was 14 years old, I stood here and listened, and then followed the family that took the sinking flag, before it was too late.

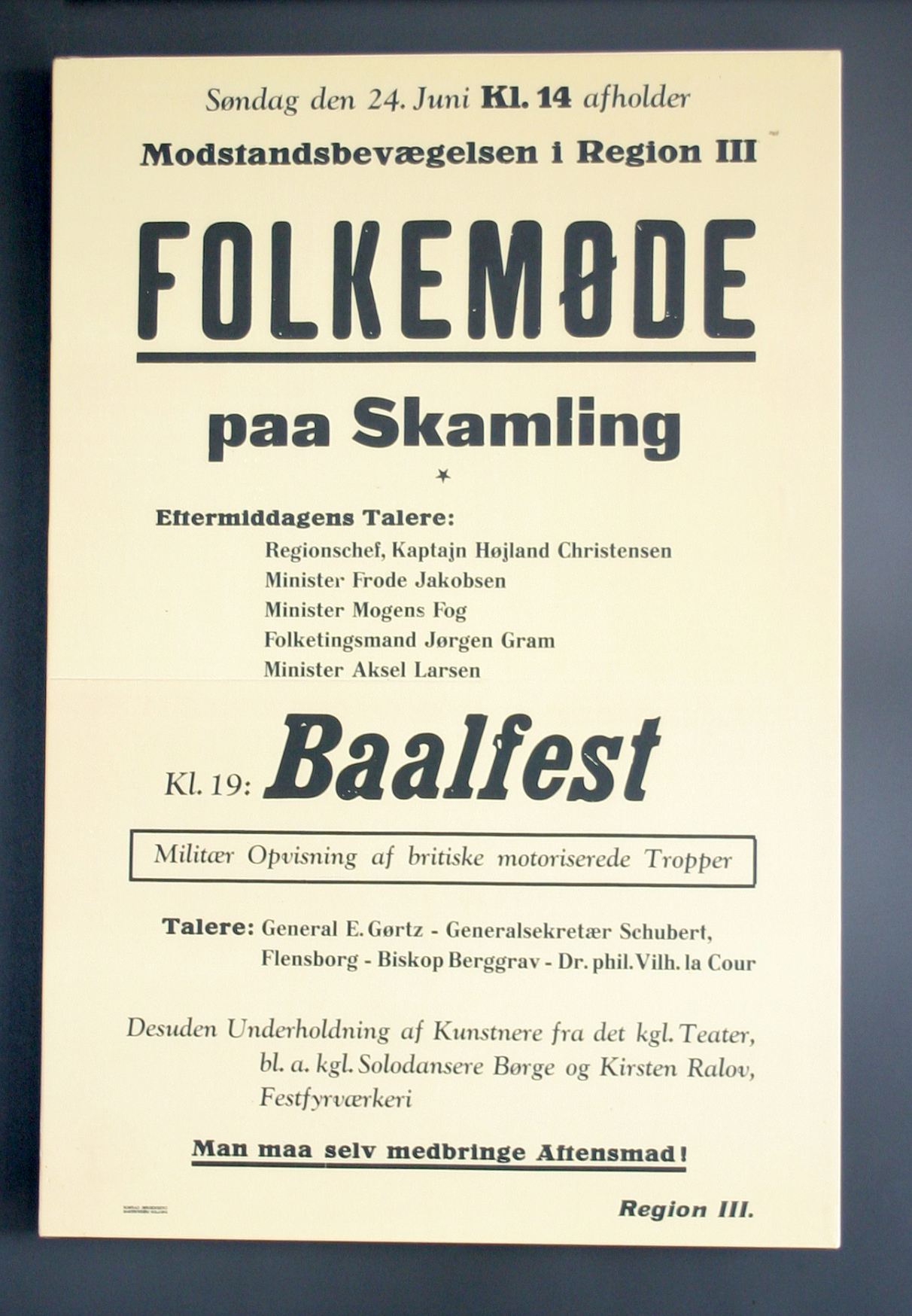
Slamlingsbanken poster, 1945.

After a speech by Professor Lauritz Weibull from Lund, Norwegian Ronald Fagen spoke in favour of genuine Scandinavism. Gunnar Gunnarsson emphasized that the idea of a Nordic border defense and "it will be Icelands greeting today." Moderator J. Kronika expressed his opinion thus, "We should today unite as in the promise of 1845 on unbreakable foster-brotherhood of assertiveness by Danish law to the ultimate benefit of the northern peoples." In the evening, men of the Young Border Defence sang their battle song, which was written by librarian Carl Dumreicher. Later there were other speakers including the teacher Inger Enemark, priest Birger Tønnesen from Oslo, and attorney Karling from Malmo. The evening ended with a bonfire and a speech by Professor William Andersen:

Here at Skamling the sea, sky and earth meet. Here all estates and tribes met each other. Here ends the family chain....

The largest meeting to date was held on 24 June 1945, to celebrate the end of the Second World War, which drew up to 100,000 participants.

A number of prominent individuals and officials have all made speeches at Skamlingsbanken, including N. F. S. Grundtvig, Laurids Skau, Orla Lehmann and Anders Fogh Rasmussen.

== Restaurant and visitor centre ==
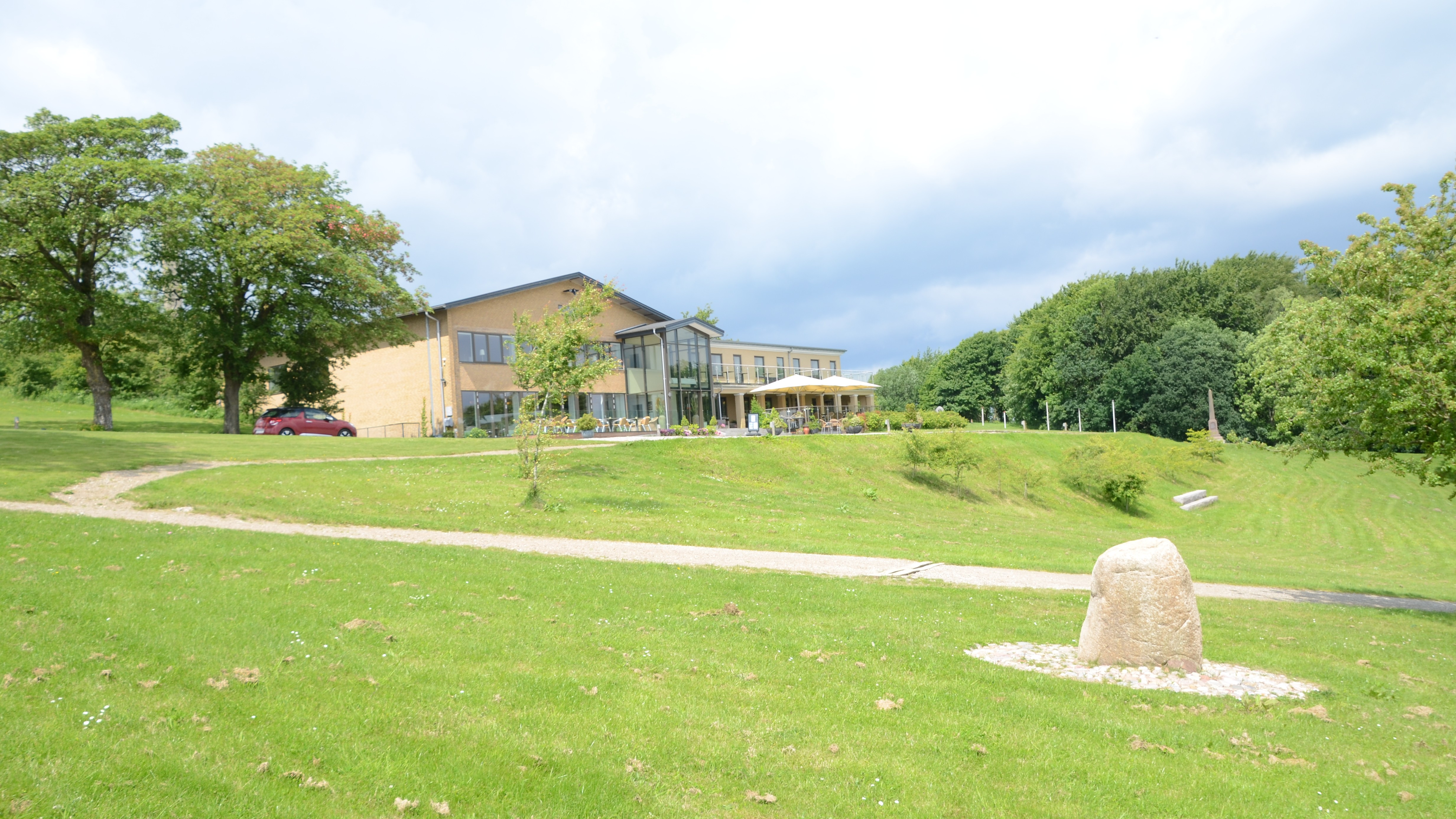
Restaurant Skamlingsbanken.in 2024.

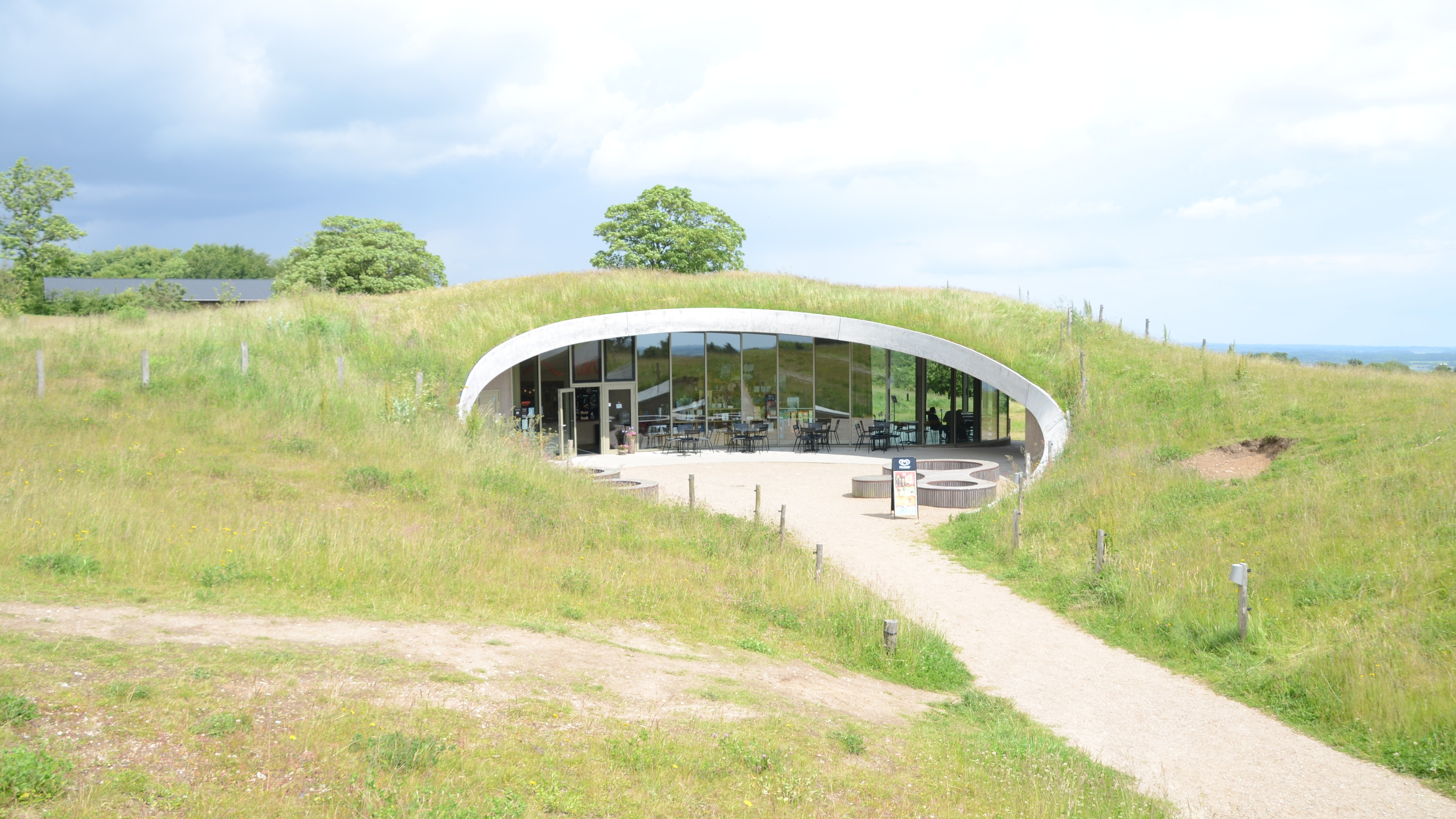
Skamlingsbanken Visitor Centre.

=== Restaurant Skamlingsbanken ===
A new Assembly Building was constructed in 1939–40 to designs by architects Jep and Dan Fink. The largest room in the building is known as Kongesalen (King's Hall). Kongesalen features a long frieze with scenes from Sænderjulland's history. The frieze was created by sculptor Henrick Starcke in 1941–1943 as a gift from the Carlsberg Foundation-

=== Skamlingsbanken visitor centre ===
A new interpretive centre was inaugurated in May 1921. The building was designed by Cebra Architects. It is built into the hillside.

== Monuments and memorials ==
=== Skamlingsbanken Memorial Column ===
There is a 16-metre (52 ft) tall memorial column dedicated to 18 people who have contributed to the Danish cause in Schleswig-Holstein on Skamlingsbanken's highest point, the Højskamling. Made of 25 granite blocks, the column was raised in 1863, although the idea was conceived in the autumn of 1845 when Staal suggested at a general meeting of millers that each of its members should donate a stone for a large granite column. The idea was shelved until the early 1850s, when a memorial committee was formed to raise money for a memorial to General Bülow in Fredericia. The committee collected 9,000 thaler, and there was much money left over. Among other things, these funds were used for the 25 blocks, the Flensburg Lion, the monument at Kolding church and various gravestones. After some debate, 18 names were selected and the design for the memorial completed by architect, Professor F. Meldahl. In the late summer of 1863, the stones, quarried at Strømstad and provided by the widow of quarry-owner Kullgren of Uddevalla, arrived. The residents of Tyrstrup Herred volunteered 104 horses for transportation to the site, and the last stone arrived at the site on 10 October. Stonemason Kleving immediately began work on the monument which subsequently only stood for five months before its destruction on 21 March 1864 by occupying Prussian forces during the 2nd Schleswig War. The Prussians had difficulty destroying the monument, and after several unsuccessful attempts forced a local stonemason to drill blasting holes into the stone. By the evening of that day the Prussians set off a large mine, which caused the pillar to fall in a southeasterly direction. On 16 April, the stones were sold at auction. Local farm owner Raaben had two locals buy the stones, thus keeping the Prussians in the dark. These were dragged into hiding in neighboring fields. After the war, the stones were recovered, and in May 1864, the pillar was raised again.

Personal names appearing on the memorial:

- W.H.F. Abrahamson (1744–1812)
- A.G. Fabricius (d. 1804)
- Frederik Fischer (1809–1871)
- Christian Flor (1792–1875)
- Peter Hiort Lorenzen (1791–1845)
- Thomas Hoyer Jensen (1771–1839)
- Claus Jaspersen (1777–1847)
- Peter Christian Koch (1807–1880)
- Hans Andersen Krüger (1816–1881)
- Nis Lorenzen Lilholt (1794–1860)
- Claus Manicus (1795–1877)
- Hans Nissen (1788–1857)
- C.H. Overbeck (1743–1796)
- Paul Detlev Christian Paulsen (1798–1854)
- Erik Pontoppidan (1698–1764)
- Laurids Skau (1817–1864)
- Hans Ivar Staal (1796–1861)
- Carl Wilhelm Anton von Wimpffen (1802–1839)

=== Podoim ===
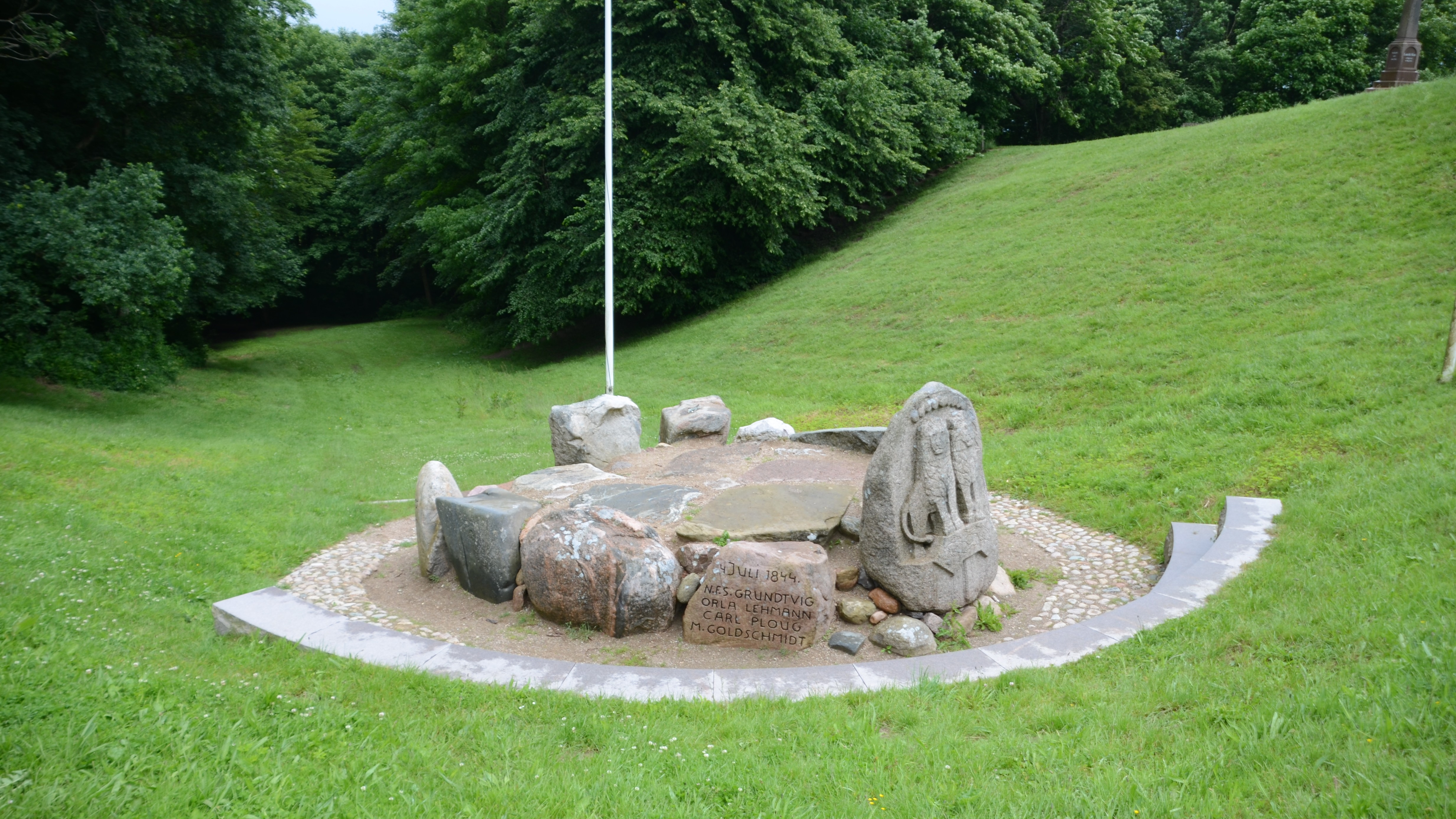
The podium in 2024.

The Skamlingsbanken lectern is a monumental carved granite stone with motifs designed by Lorenz Frølich and carvings by Niels Larsen Stevns. At a midsummer meeting in 1902, it was decided to create this podium and by 24 June 1903, it was ready for inauguration. Around the podium stand five groups of trees, symbolizing that the five Nordic countries are inseparable. The trees are: Beech for Denmark birch for Sweden Spruce for Norway, a tree for Finland and Rowan for Iceland.

=== Memorials to individual people ===
There are other memorials in the area around Skamlingsbanken, four of which are located about 50 metres (160 ft) from the column commemorating Pastor M. Mørk. Hansen, Peter Skau, N. F. S. Grundtvig and C. Flor. During a rally in 1883 for the Nordic folk high school principals and high school teachers, the idea of raising a memorial to Grundtvig arose. This subsequently happened at a private party on 4 July 1884, the 40th anniversary of Grundtvigs keynote speech at the site. At the behest of the South Jutland Central Association, a memorial was raised for C. Flor on 14 July 1912.

A little further away in the woods stand two other memorials. The one dedicated to Laurids Skau, inaugurated on 18 May 1883, the 50th anniversary of the first Skamlingsbanken Meeting, bears a verse by Grundtvig:

The word sounded like thunder, rolling over the forest,
difficulty and thunderbolt, tossed gloss' of waves,
lit bonfires in the giant's arms, lighted Skamlingsbankens beacon
with the clear flames

At the location where the Board of Skamlingsbanken pitched their tent at meetings, a memorial to Regenburg was raised on 2 September 1898.

Individual memorials of Skamlingsbanken

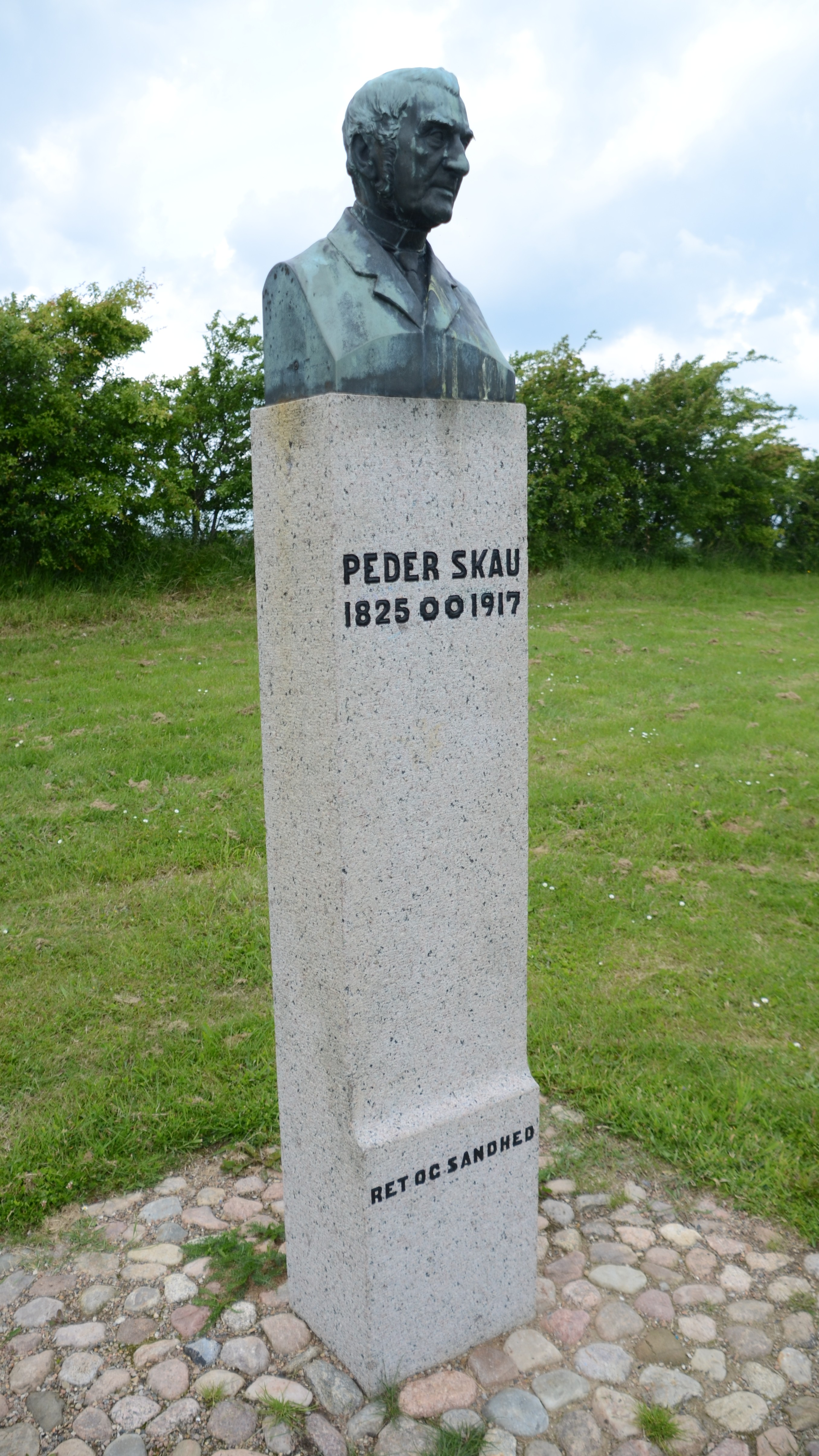
Peder Skau

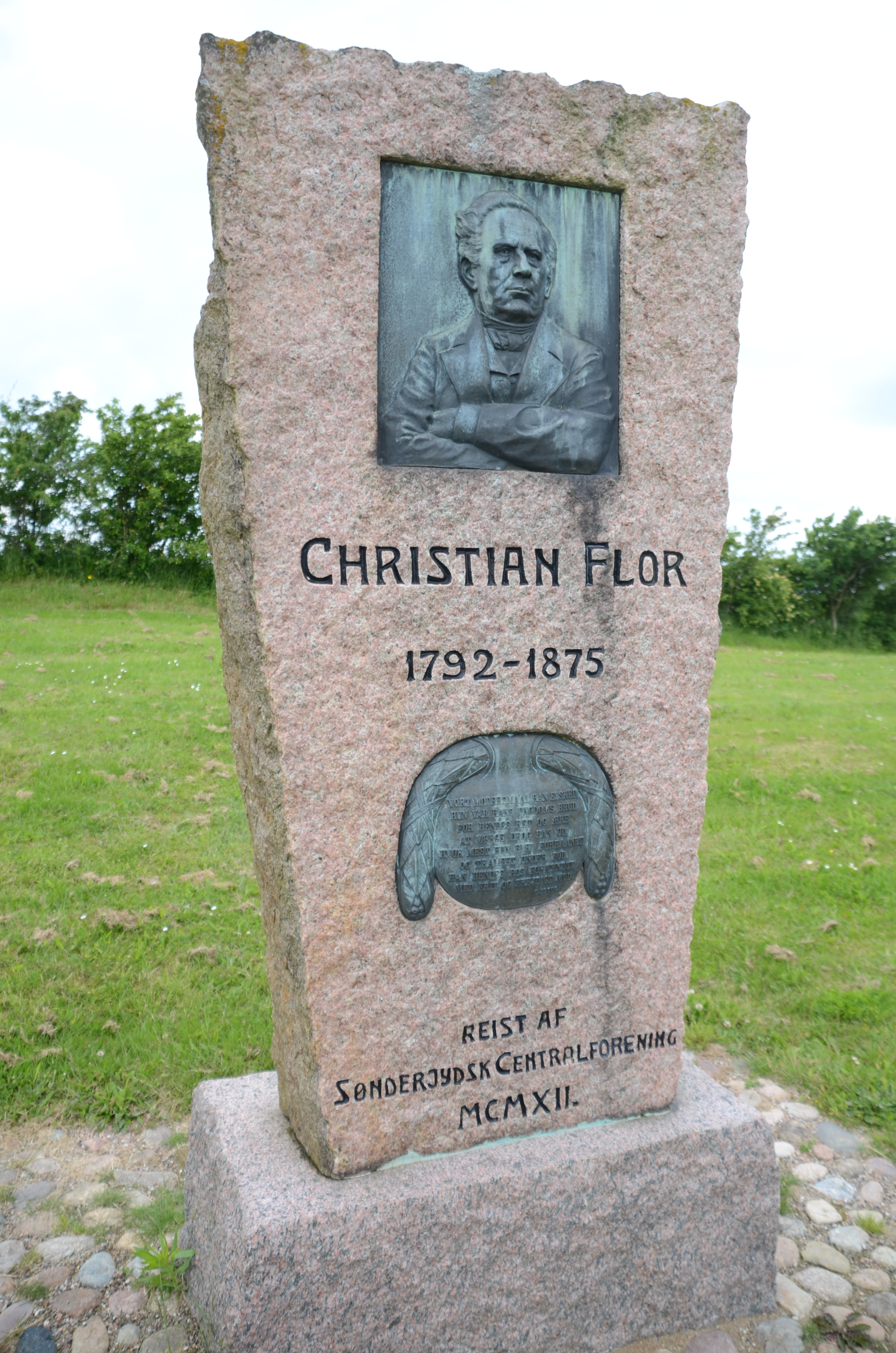
Christian Flor

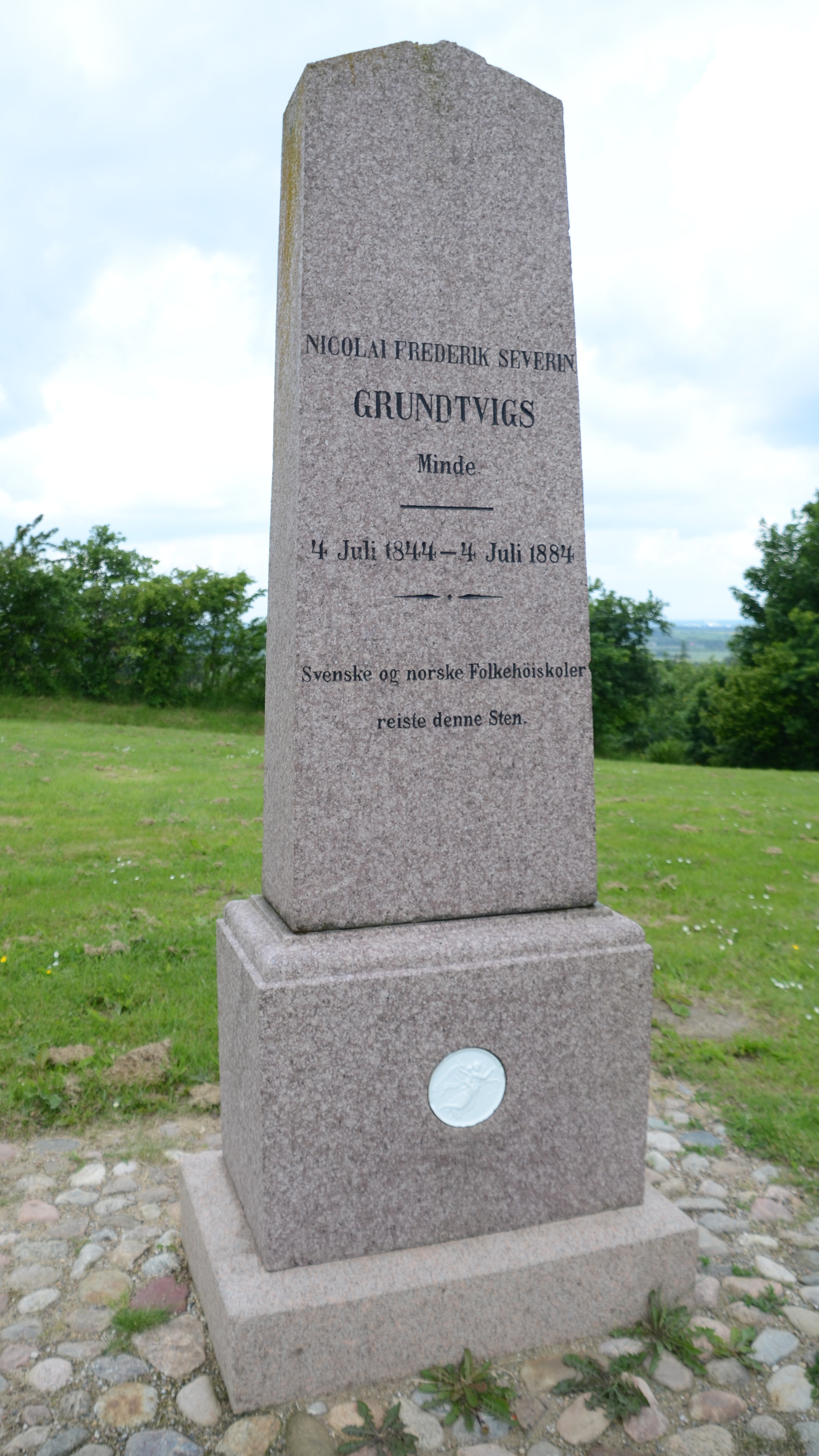
N. F. S. Grundtvig

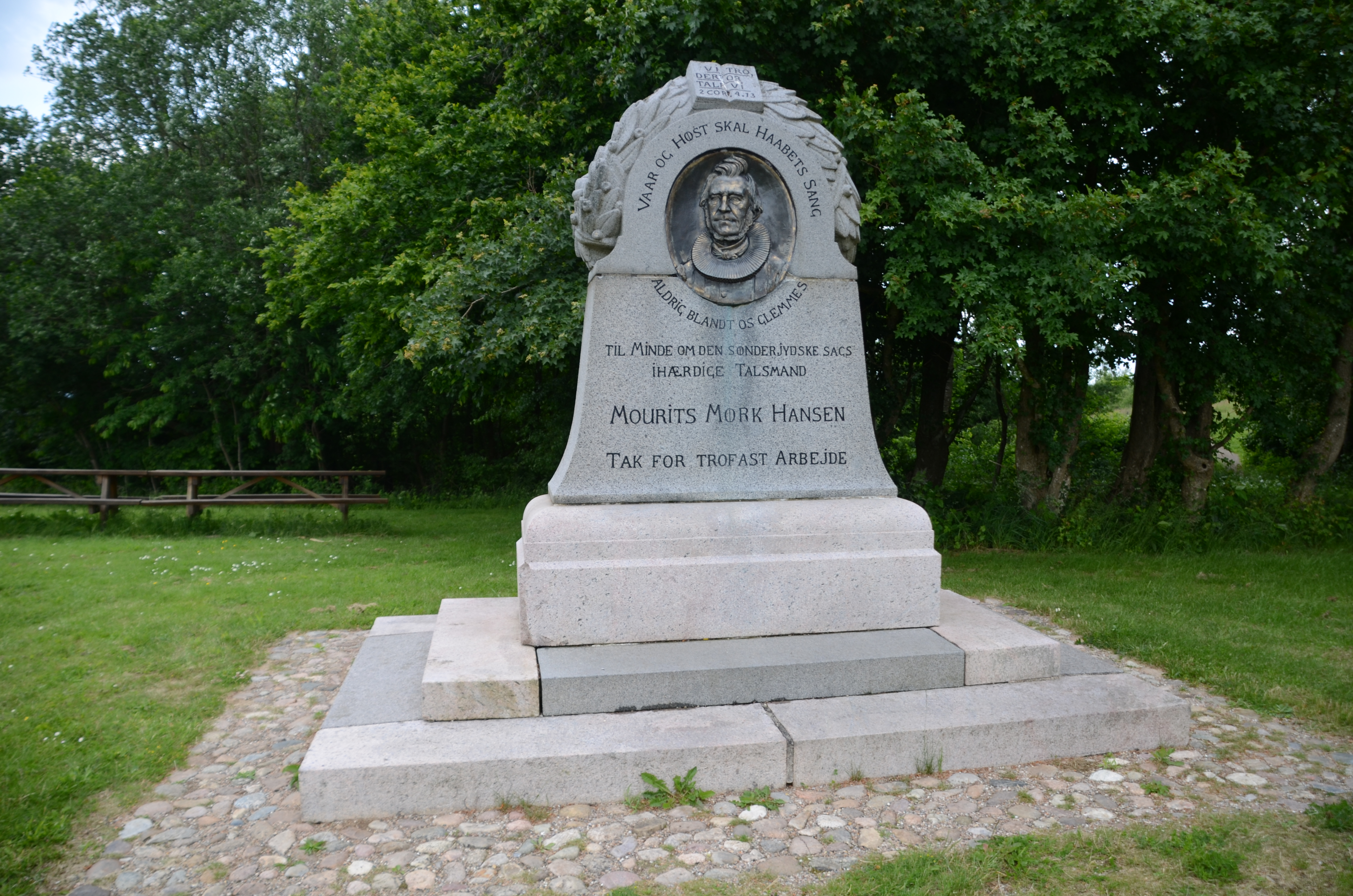
Mouritz Mørk Hansen

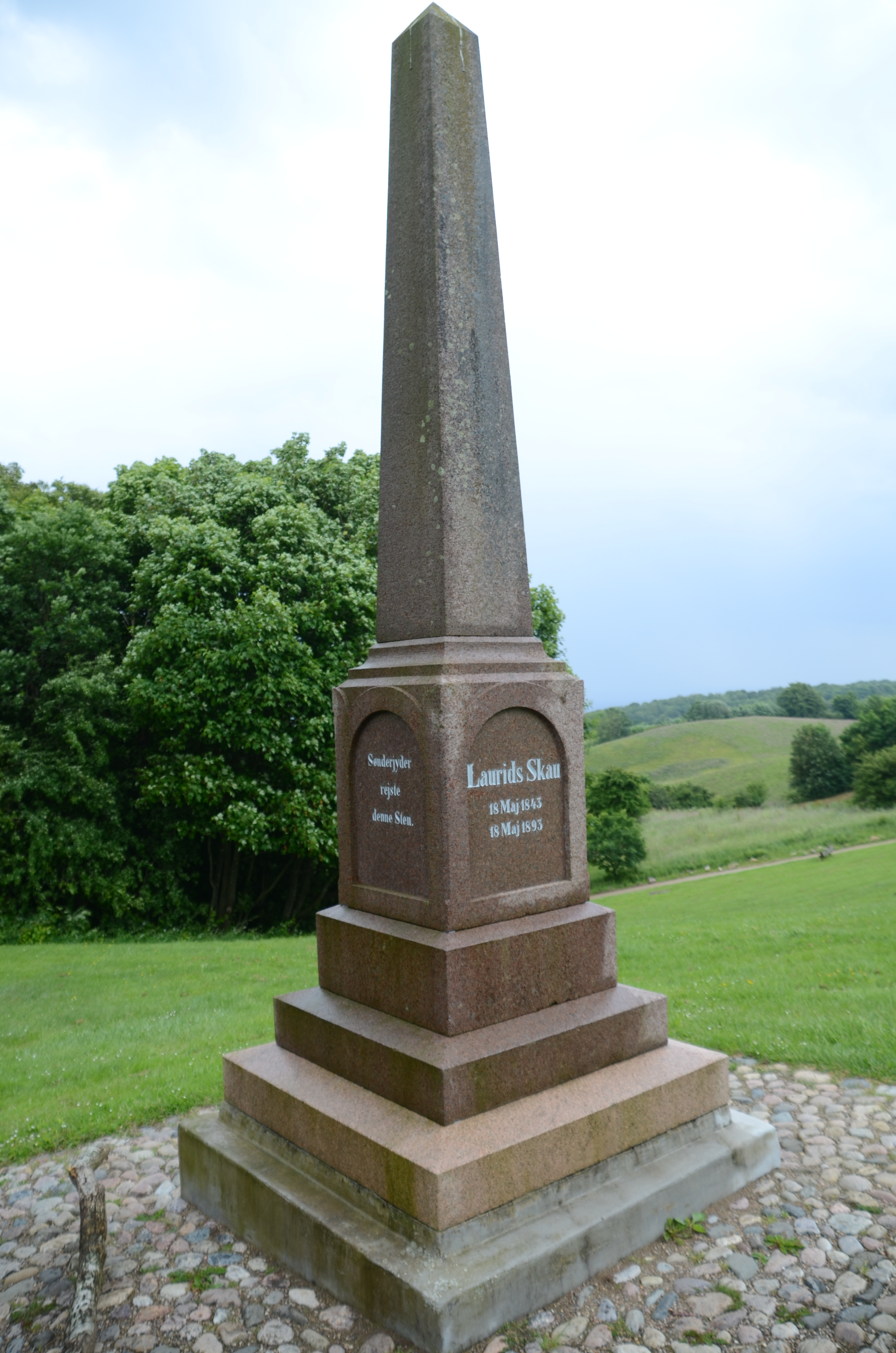
Laurids Skau

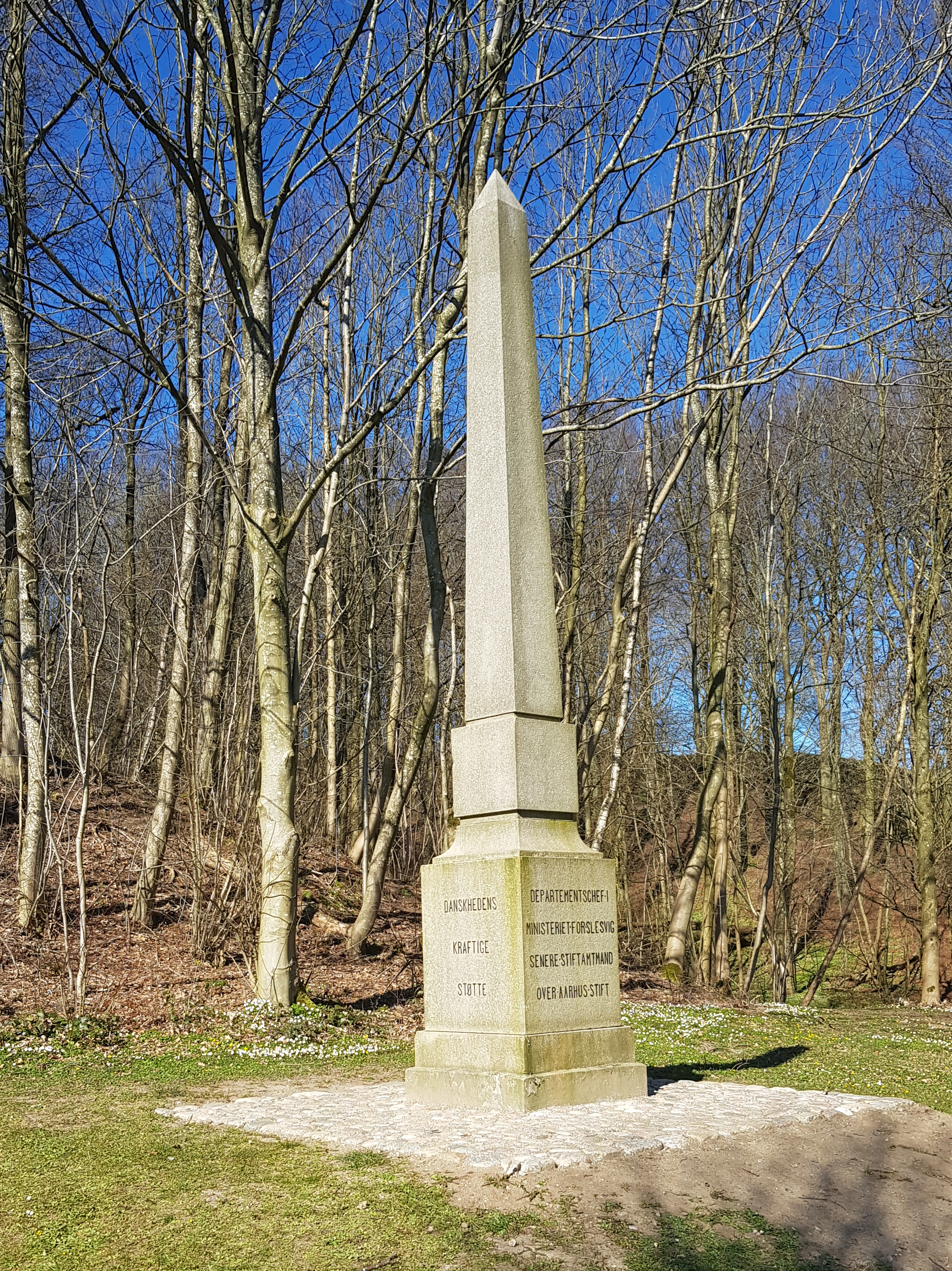
Theodor August Jes Regenburg

=== World War II Memorial ===
Klokkestablen, a memorial to the 100 fallen resistance fighters of South Jutland during World War II also stands at Skamlingsbanken. The idea for this came from the resistance movement of Region III, South Jutland. Every day the bell sounds the Prince Jørgens March, which was used during the German occupation to introduce Danish language radio broadcasts from the BBC in London.

== Today ==
The Skamlingsbakke plays host to the Skamlingsbakke Society's annual general assembly. A number of other events are also hosted by the society, focussing on song, dance and other public speeking. Skamlingsbanken is also a popular venue for Constitution Fat celebrations (5 July).

Since 1998, the Danish royal theater has held annual opera concerts at Skamlingsbanken with up to 30,000 people in the audience.
