= Frank Thompson (designer) =

American costume designer (1920–1977)

Frank L. Thompson (August 19, 1920, Shawnee, Oklahoma - June 4, 1977, Los Angeles, California) was an American costume designer for the stage and screen. Active as a designer on Broadway from 1947 to 1972, he designed costumes for the original productions of plays by Noël Coward, Paddy Chayefsky, Neil Simon, and Tennessee Williams among other prominent writers. He also designed costumes for several Broadway musicals, including works by Irving Berlin, Lorenz Hart, and Richard Rodgers. He is best remembered for his costume designs for the American Ballet Theatre's celebrated 1976 production of Pyotr Ilyich Tchaikovsky's The Nutcracker starring Mikhail Baryshnikov which became an American television classic, and for his designs for the world premiere of Leonard Bernstein's Mass.

== Life and career ==
Frank Leath Thompson, born part Cherokee in Shawnee, Oklahoma, to Frank W. and Carrie Thompson. He was a 1938 graduate of Shawnee High School and attended the University of Oklahoma one year before entering the navy. At his discharge after the war he stayed in California and attended of the University of California. Beginning his career on Broadway in 1946 as a wardrobe assistant, his first work as lead costume designer was for the short lived Monte Carlo and Alma Sanders musical Louisiana Lady (1947) and the short lived original Broadway production of J.B. Priestley's The Linden Tree (1948). He also worked as assistant costume designer on several prominent productions of the 1940s and 1950s, including High Button Shoes (1947), Where's Charley? (1948), Gentlemen Prefer Blondes (1949), Out of This World (1950), Seventeen (1951), My Darlin' Aida (1952), Kismet (1953), and The Pajama Game (1954).

After this point in his career, Thompson only worked as a lead costume designer. Broadway productions for which he designed costumes included, Herman Wouk's Nature's Way (1957), Noël Coward's Nude with Violin (1957), Coward's Present Laughter (1958), Marcel Aymé's Moonbirds (1959), Paddy Chayefsky's The Tenth Man (1959), George Panetta's Viva Madison Avenue! (1960), Jack Sher's The Perfect Setup (1962), Herman Raucher's Harold (1962), Richard Rodgers and Lorenz Hart Pal Joey (1963 revival), Hugh Williams's The Irregular Verb to Love (1963), Frank Loesser's Guys and Dolls (1965 revival), Harold Rome's The Zulu and the Zayda (1965), Irving Berlin's Annie Get Your Gun (1966 revival), Tennessee Williams's The Rose Tattoo (1966 revival), Lonnie Coleman's A Place For Polly (1970), Neil Simon's The Gingerbread Lady (1970), and Conor Cruise O'Brien's Murderous Angels (1971). His last costume designs for Broadway were for the 1972 revival of Clifford Odets's The Country Girl.

Outside of Broadway, Thompson spent five years working as a costume designer for Ringling Brothers and Barnum & Bailey Circus. He also designed costumes frequently for the New York City Opera (NYCO), the Los Angeles Civic Light Opera. He notably designed costumes for the world premiere of Gian Carlo Menotti's The Most Important Man with the NYCO in 1971. That same year he designed the costumes for the world premiere of Leonard Bernstein Mass which was commissioned in honor of John F. Kennedy by Jacqueline Kennedy after the president's assassination.

Also active as a designer for motion pictures, he designed the costumes for John Cromwell's The Goddess (1958), Delbert Mann's Middle of the Night (1959) Sidney Lumet's The Fugitive Kind (1960), and Arthur Hiller's The Hospital (1971).

Thompson died in 1977 at the age of 56 at Saint John's Health Center in Los Angeles. His last creations were for the American Ballet Theatre's celebrated 1976 production of Pyotr Ilyich Tchaikovsky's The Nutcracker starring Mikhail Baryshnikov. The production premiered at the Kennedy Center in Washington, D.C. in December 1976, and received its New York premiere on May 18, 1977 at the Metropolitan Opera House. This production achieved particular popularity when it was recorded for television in 1977, starring Gelsey Kirkland as Clara, and became a perennial favorite on American television during the Christmas season in the following decades.
