= Dratch =

Dratch is a surname. Notable people with the surname include:

- Mark Dratch, American rabbi and the founder of JSafe
- Rachel Dratch (born 1966), American actress, comedian, and writer

== See also ==
- Drach
