= Tangerine (musical) =

- A Musical Satire of the Sexes
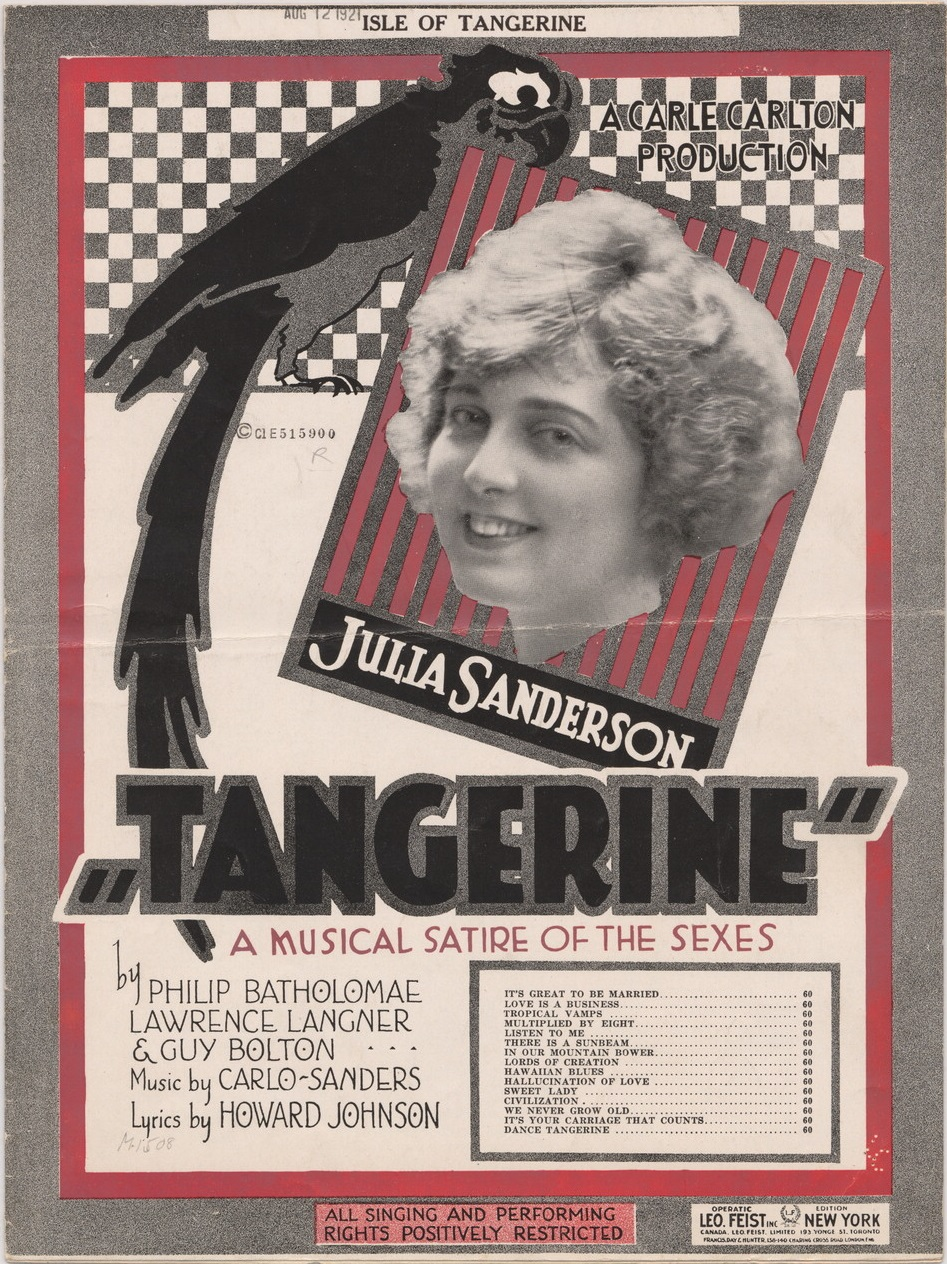
- Original sheet music cover
- Music: Monte Carlo; Alma M. Sanders
- Lyrics: Howard Johnston
- Book: Philip Bartholomae; Guy Bolton
- Basis: Philip Bartholomae & Lawrence Langner play
- Productions: 1921 Broadway

Tangerine is a musical with music by Monte Carlo and Alma M. Sanders, lyrics by Howard Johnston, about three men jailed for not paying alimony, written by Philip Bartholomae and Guy Bolton.

The piece premiered on Broadway at the Casino Theatre in 1921, running for 361 performances, one of two hits from the season (the other being Shuffle Along).

== Plot ==
Setting: Alimony Jail, New York; Main Street, fictional Isle of Tangerine

Dick Owens gets jailed with his three friends, he for a brawl and his friends for not paying alimony. Owens is visited in jail by Shirley Dalton, the girl he loves. She has decided not to marry him until his jailed friends are happily back with their wives. Owens takes his friends then escapes to Tangerine, a South Sea isle run by King Home-Brew, an American expatriate. In Tangerine, the women do all the work while the men stay at home. Eventually the men are sick of the stay at home life, and all couples are reunited.

== Original production ==
The show premiered on Broadway at the Casino Theatre on August 9, 1921, and closed August 26, 1922, running for 361 performances. It was directed by Carle Carlton, set design Lee Simonson and P. Dodd Ackerman, costume design Dorothy Armstrong, Mme. Francis, and Pieter Mayer, and musical direction by Gus Kleinecke.

The cast included Julia Sanderson (Shirley Dalton), California Four (Tangerine Police Force), Becky Cauble (Elsie Loring), Mary Collins (Akamai), Frank Crumit (Dick Owens), Grace DeCarlton (Aoha Oe), Helen Frances (Kulikuli), Carolyn Hancock (Ukola), John E. Hazzard (King Home-Brew/Joe Perkins "The Easy Boss"), Joseph Herbert, Jr. (Fred Allen), Frank Holbrook (Oro), Brooke Johns (Kate Allen), P. A. Leonard (A Warden), Anna Ludmilla (Arameda), Jeannetta Methven (Noa), Victoria White (Huhu), Wayne Nunn (Clarence), Edna Pierre (Kate Allen), Harry Puck (Jack Floyd), Billy Rhodes (Lee Loring), Ruth Rollins (Polihu), Nerene Swinton (Pilikia), Gladys Wilson (Mildred Floyd), and Hazel Wright (Aloha). Allen Kearns would eventually play the role of Lee Loring.

== Song list ==
Music by Monte Carlo and Alma M. Sanders; lyrics by Howard E. Johnson (Unless otherwise noted)

Act I

- "Overture"
- "It's Great to Be Married" - Fred Allen, Lee Loring and Jack Floyd (music by Alma M. Sanders, Monte Carlo and Carle Carlton)
- "Love Is a Business" - Shirley Dalton, Dick Owens, Fred Allen, Lee Loring and Jack Floyd
- "Isle of Tangerine" - Shirley Dalton and Dick Owens
- "The Sea of the Tropics - Dance" - Arameda and Oro
- "Ode and Sun Dance" - Noa, Quartette and Eight Little Wives (music by Alma M. Sanders, Monte Carlo and Carle Carlton)
- "Listen to Me" - Shirley Dalton and Dick Owens
- "In Our Mountain Bower" - Noa, Quartette and Eight Little Wives
- "There's a Sunbeam for Every Drop of Rain" - Lee Loring and Elsie Loring
- "Man Is the Lord of It All" - Shirley Dalton, Mildred Floyd, Elsie Loring, Kate Allen, Fred Allen, Lee Loring and Jack Floyd (music by Jean Schwartz)
- "Finale" - Shirley Dalton and Dick Owens

Act II

- "South Sea Island Blues" - Quartette, Dick Owens, Fred Allen, Lee Loring and Jack Floyd (music by Dave Zoob and Frank Crumit)
- "Old Melodies" - Dick Owens and Quartette
- "Tropic Vamps" - Eight Little Wives
- "Sweet Lady" - Shirley Dalton and Dick Owens (music by Frank Crumit; lyrics by Dave Zoob)
- "Civilization" - Joe Perkins (The Easy Boss) and Eight Little Wives
- "It's Your Carriage That Counts" - Shirley Dalton and Eight Little Wives
- "She Was Very Dear To Me" - Joe Perkins (The Easy Boss) (music and lyrics by Benjamin Hapgood Burt)
- "Dance Tangerine" - Arameda and Oro
- "We'll Never Grow Old" - Elsie Loring and Lee Loring
- "Finale"
- "You And I (Atta Baby) [interpolated in 1922]
