= The Linden Tree =

1947 play by English dramatist J. B. Priestley

The Linden Tree is a 1947 play by the English dramatist J. B. Priestley. It was first produced at the Duchess Theatre, London on 15 August 1947 and ran for 422 performances. The play had a brief run on Broadway in March 1948, lasting only seven performances, in a production directed by George Schaefer, using costumes designed by Frank Thompson, and starring Boris Karloff as Professor Linden. It also was performed in Ottawa, Canada in August 1949 with Rex Linden portrayed by Christopher Plummer.

== Original London cast ==
- Professor Robert Linden – Lewis Casson
- Isabel Linden (his wife) – Sybil Thorndike
- Rex Linden (his son) – John Dodsworth
- Dr Jean Linden (his eldest daughter) – Freda Gaye
- Marion de Saint Vaury (his daughter) – Sonia Williams
- Dinah Linden (his youngest daughter) – Tilsa Page
- Alfred Lockhart (university secretary) – J. Leslie Frith
- Edith Westmore (a student) – Carmel McSharry
- Bernard Fawcell (a student) – Terence Soall
- Mrs Cotton (housekeeper) – Everley Gregg

The play was directed by Michael Macowan.

== Plot ==
The play takes place in 1947 England in the home of Professor Robert Linden, who holds the chair of modern history at the provincial University of Burmanley. Rationing and austerity seem to have fostered opportunism, escapism and confrontation within the Linden family, who have gathered to celebrate Professor Linden's 65th birthday and each of whom is struggling with their own crises. Linden wants only to continue teaching in a world that no longer seems to share his quiet ideals. The new vice-chancellor of the university is pressing Linden to retire, and family itself divides along political lines, the worldly versus the idealists. The critic Michael Billington summarises it thus: "Linden's put-upon wife, super-spiv son and expatriate daughter all press him to opt for retirement. But his other daughters – a dedicated NHS doctor and a 17-year-old cello-playing student – urge him to fight on."

== Critical reception ==
Reviewing the first production, Philip Hope-Wallace of The Manchester Guardian, thought it a good play, but one that "remains obstinately on this side of greatness", because the central character, Professor Linden, is "good and dogged" rather than heroic. The reviewer in The Times also considered that the play was good but not great. After a 2006 revival of the play, Billington, reviewing it in The Guardian thought it "a key work in the immediate post-war theatre".

== Revivals and adaptations ==
The play was revived at the Orange Tree Theatre in 2006, and at the Pentameters Theatre in 2011.

A television version was broadcast in the Play of the Month series in September 1974. BBC Radio 4 broadcast an adaptation by Mollie Greenhalgh directed by Kay Patrick in 1997, with Geoffrey Banks as Professor Linden, Kathleen Helme as Isabel, Christopher Godwin as Rex Linden, Carole Hayman as Dr Jean Linden, Joanna Wake as Marion de Saint Vaury, Penelope Reynolds as Dinah Linden and David Mahlowe as Alfred Lockhart. It was re-broadcast in 2017 on BBC Radio 4 Extra.
