= Drach =

Drach is a surname. Notable people with the surname include:

- Albert Drach (1902–1995), Austrian writer and playwright
- David Paul Drach (1791–1868), Alsatian-Catican Roman Catholic librarian of Jewish descent
- Eduard Drach (born 1965)
- Gennady Drach
- George E. Drach (1906–1966), American politician and lawyer
- Gustave W. Drach (1861-1940), American architect
- Ivan Drach (1936–2018), Ukrainian poet, screenwriter, literary critic and politician
- Michel Drach (1930–1990), French film director, writer, producer and actor
- Vanja Drach (1932–2009), Croatian theatre and film actor

== See also ==
- Cuevas del Drach, caves of Majorca, Balearic Islands, Spain
- The Caves of Drach, a juvenile science fiction novel
