= Alma Sanders =

American songwriter and composer (1882–1956)

Alma M. Sanders
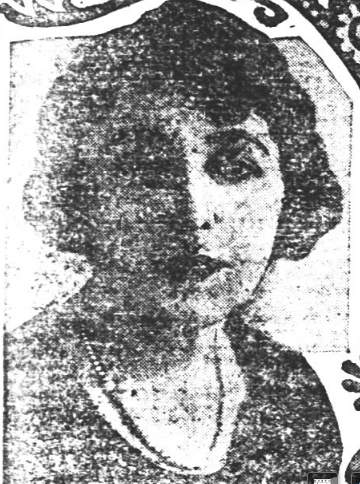
- Alma M. Sanders from a 1921 newspaper.
- Born: 1882; Chicago, Illinois, U.S.
- Died: December 15, 1956 (aged 73–74); New York City, New York, U.S.
- Other names: Alma M. Sanders, Alma M. S. Carlo
- Occupations: pianist, composer
- Years active: 1910s-1940s

Alma M. Sanders (1882 – December 15, 1956) was an American songwriter and composer of popular music, including several Broadway musicals, with her composer husband, Monte Carlo.

== Early life ==
Sanders was born in Chicago, Illinois. She studied music there, and sang in concerts and as a church soloist.

== Music ==
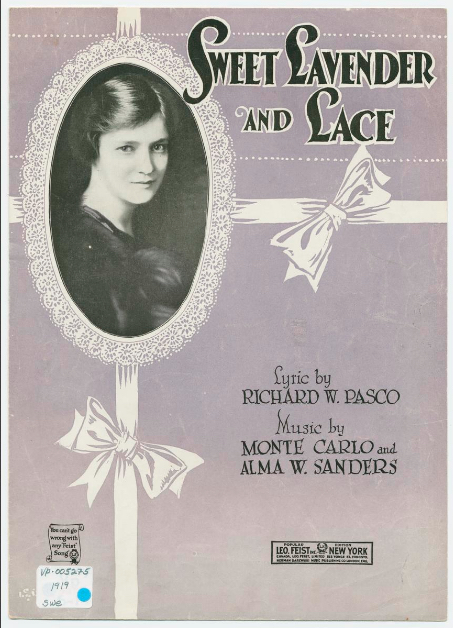
Sheet music for "Sweet Lavender and Lace" (1919), by Richard W. Pascoe, Monte Carlo, and Alma Sanders

On Broadway, Alma Sanders' compositions and songs were heard in the shows The Voice of McConnell (1918–1919), Tangerine (1921–1922), Elsie (1923), The Chiffon Girl (1924), Princess April (1924), Oh! Oh! Nurse (1925–1926), Mystery Moon (1930), and Louisiana Lady (1947). She also co-wrote the score of a film, Ireland Today.

Compositions by Sanders (with and without Monte Carlo as co-composer) included "Two Lips are Roses", "Honeymoon Home", "Sweet Lady", "Every Tear is a Smile (in an Irishman's Heart)", "Goodbye Broadway, Hello France!", "Sleepytime Rag: Pickaninny Lullaby" (1914, lyrics by Florence Cooke), "Some Pepp" (1915), "Along the Road to Singapore" (1915, lyrics by Richard Pascoe), "That Dear Old Mother of Mine" (1915, lyrics by Richard Pascoe), "Dance of the Teenie-Weenies" (1916), "Ev'ry Sammy needs his smokin' over there" (1917, lyrics by Monte Carlo), "Hong Kong" (1917, lyrics by Richard Pascoe), "The Wild Irish Rose That God Gave Me" (1917, lyrics by Richard Pascoe), "That Tumble-down Shack in Athlone" (1918, lyrics by Richard Pascoe), "Keep a Steady Heart (Till the Boys Return" (1918), "Every Tear is a Smile in an Irishman's Heart" (1919, lyrics by Dan Sullivan), "Sweet Lavender and Lace" (1919, lyrics by Richard Pascoe), " Ten Baby Fingers" (1920, lyrics by Harry Edelheit), "In Old Madeira" (1920, lyrics by George Wehner), "Little Town in the Ould County Down" (1920, lyrics by Richard Pascoe), "Fragrance of Spring" (1921), "Too Many Kisses Mean Too Many Tears" (1924), "My Heaven" (1928, lyrics by Monte Carlo), and "The House-Boat on the Styx" (1928, lyrics by Monte Carlo).

Sanders became a member of ASCAP in 1923. Many of her works were recorded, by various ensembles and performers, before 1926. In 1920, Carlo and Sanders signed an exclusive contract with music publisher Jerome H. Remick. "It was inevitable that sooner or later someone would demand the exclusive rights to their very interesting songs," commented a music publication on that occasion. Her last project was a musical adaptation of a children's book, Heaven is a Circus by John Bernard Kelly, for the Catholic Writers Guild.

== Personal life ==
Alma Sanders married Ernest Benjamin. They had two children, Edward C. Benjamin and Arlene Benjamin, before they divorced in 1921. Her daughter died in the 1936 fire at Lum's Chinese Restaurant in New York. Sanders' second husband was Danish composer Hans von Holstein, better known as Monte Carlo. She died in 1956, aged 74 years, in New York.

Her "Some Pepp" was included on the CD Cake Walks, Two Steps and Rags by Women Composers (1999) by Nora Hulse.
