= George E. Drach =

American lawyer and politician

George E. Drach (August 25, 1906 – October 21, 1966) was an American lawyer and politician.

Drach was born in Springfield, Illinois. He graduated from Springfield High School and served in the United States Navy during World War II. Drach received his law degree from University of Illinois College of Law and then practiced law in Springfield. Drach served in the Illinois Senate from 1951 until his death in 1966. He was a Republican. Drach died at St. John's Hospital in Springfield, Illinois, from complications after undergoing gall bladder surgery.
