= Warm =

Warm, WARM, or Warmth may refer to:

- A somewhat high temperature; heat
- Kindness

== Music ==
=== Albums ===
- Warm (Herb Alpert album), 1969
- Warm (Jeff Tweedy album), 2018
- Warm (Johnny Mathis album), 1958, and the title song
- Warm (The Lettermen album), 1967, and the title song
- Warmer (Jeff Tweedy album), 2019
- Warmer (Randy VanWarmer album), 1979

=== Songs ===
- "Warm", by Ariana Grande from Eternal Sunshine Deluxe: Brighter Days Ahead, 2025
- "Warm", by Charli XCX featuring Haim from Charli, 2019
- "Warm", by Majid Jordan from Majid Jordan, 2016
- "Warm", by Swans from The Great Annihilator, 1995
- "Warmer", by Bea Miller from Chapter Two: Red and Aurora, 2017
- "Warmth", by Bastille from Wild World, 2016
- "Warmth", by C418 from Minecraft - Volume Beta, 2013
- "Warmth", by Janet Jackson from Damita Jo, 2004

== Other uses ==
- Warm., taxonomic author abbreviation of Eugenius Warming (1841–1924), Danish botanist
- WARM (AM), a radio station licensed to Scranton, Pennsylvania, United States
- WARM-FM, a radio station (103.3 FM) licensed to York, Pennsylvania, United States
- Wartime reserve modes (WARM), military procedures held in reserve for wartime or emergency use
- Women's Art Resources of Minnesota, an American women's art organization

== See also ==
- Internal energy
- Enthalpy
- Thermal energy
- Climate
- Weather
- Hunt the thimble § Playing with Hot or Cold
