= Christiansfeld Municipality =

Former municipality of Denmark

Coordinates: 55°21′16″N 9°29′12″E

Christiansfeld Municipality (Danish kommune) existed until January 1, 2007, in South Jutland County. It was named after Christiansfeld. The municipality covered an area of 211 km^{2}, and had a total population of 9,585 (2005). Its last mayor was Jørgen From, a member of the Venstre (Liberal Party) political party. The municipality was created in 1970 as the result of a kommunalreform ("Municipality Reform") that combined the following parishes:

- Aller Parish
- Bjerning Parish
- Christiansfeld Parish
- Fjelstrup Parish
- Frørup Parish
- Hejls Parish
- Hjerndrup Parish
- Stepping Parish
- Taps Parish
- Tyrstrup Parish
- Vejstrup Parish

Christiansfeld municipality ceased to exist as the result of Kommunalreformen ("The Municipality Reform" of 2007). Bjerning, Hjerndrup and Fjelstrup parishes of Christiansfeld municipality were merged with Gram, Haderslev and Vojens municipalities to form a new Haderslev municipality. The remainder of the municipality was merged into a new Kolding Municipality.
