= Gennady Drach =

Russian scientist (born 1942)

Gennady Vladimirovich Drach
- Born: February 5, 1942; Tuapse
- Education: Rostov State University
- Awards: Honored Scientist of the Russian Federation (2007); Honorary Worker of Higher Professional Education of the Russian Federation (2002)
- Scientific career
- Fields: culturology, history of ancient Greek philosophy
- Workplaces: Southern Federal University

Gennady Vladimirovich Drach (Russian: Геннадий Владимирович Драч; born February 5, 1942) is a Russian scientist in the fields of culturology and history of ancient Greek philosophy. He is a professor at the Southern Federal University, vice president of the Russian Philosophical Society (Российское философское общество), and a 2007 Honored Scientist of the Russian Federation. He is a member of the Editorial Boards for Humanitarians of the South of Russia and Scientific Thought of Caucasus.

== Honors and awards ==
- Honored Scientist of the Republic of Adygea (2012)
- Honored Scientist of the Russian Federation (2007)
- Honored Scientist of the Republic of Ingushetia (2006)
- Honoured Worker of Higher Professional Education of the Russian Federation (2002)
