= Meïr Aron Goldschmidt =

Danish publisher, journalist and novelist (1819–1887)

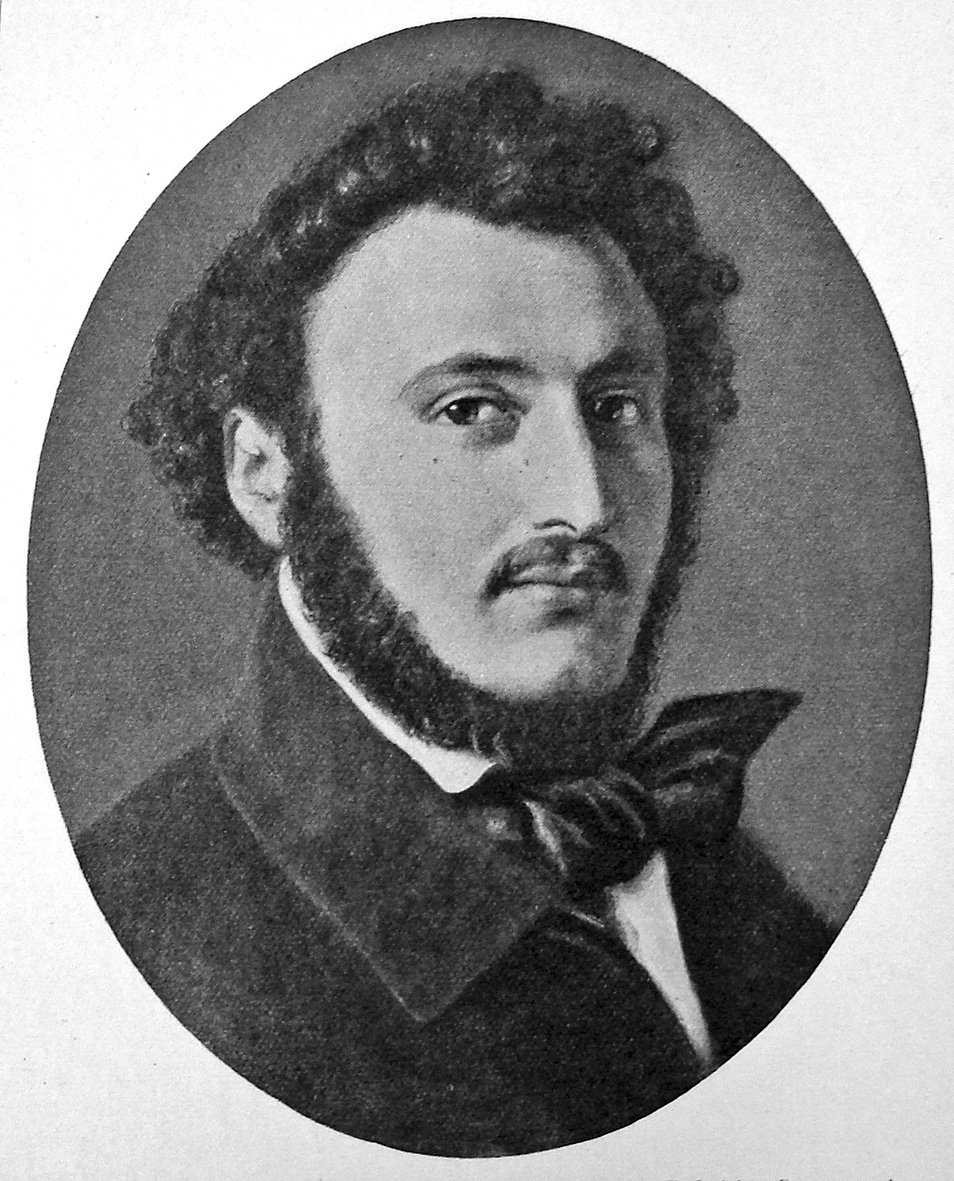
Meïr Aron Goldschmidt.

Meïr Aron Goldschmidt (October 26, 1819 – August 15, 1887) was a Danish publisher, journalist and novelist. He was the founding editor of the satirical and political magazine Corsaren.

== Biography ==
Goldschmidt was born in Vordingborg, Denmark but raised in Copenhagen. He was the son of Aron Goldschmidt (1792–1848) and Lea Levin Rothschild (1797–1870). He belonged to a strictly Orthodox Jewish family of merchants.

He attended the University of Copenhagen where one of his instructors was the Danish theologist Henrik Nicolai Clausen (1793–1877). He took artium in 1836, graduating with a degree in philology. His meeting with classical Greek culture changed much of his attitude and made him try to balance between Jewish and non-Jewish thoughts. Especially the Greek idea of Nemesis impressed him and imbued much of his later works.

In 1837 he founded Præstø Amts Tidende which in 1839 merged with Callundborg Ugeblad to become Sjællandsposten. He sold that in 1840 and in the same year founded the weekly political and satirical Corsaren where, under the cover of different editors, he criticised the king. As the real editor, he was sentenced to prison and a fined with future censorship on June 7, 1843, in the Supreme Court. In 1846 Goldschmidt sold Corsaren.

Goldschmidt had previously praised Søren Kierkegaard for his Either/Or, but the friendship was destroyed after continued attack on Kierkegaard appeared in Corsar. From 1847 until 1859 he ran a political magazine called Nord og Syd. To broaden his horizons culturally and politically, Meïr Aron Goldschmidt visited Germany, Austria, Italy and Switzerland.

About 1860 he stopped his career as an opinion former and concentrated on literature. His literature shows an interest in the metaphysical and philosophical. His first novel En Jøde (1845; Eng. transl. A Jew, 1990) is the first description of the Copenhagen Jewish milieu viewed from within. The large novel Hjemløs (1853) deals with the idea of Nemesis and so does the important Arvingen (1865), the first Danish fine literary treatment of divorce. Very valuable are his tales and novellas dealing with Jews described in a special mixture of irony and sympathy. Not seldom, realism is broken by a special mysticism.

== Personal life ==
He was married to Johanne Marie Sonne (1825–1900). The marriage dissolved in 1852. From this short-lived marriage he had a son in 1846 and a daughter in 1848.

== Selected works ==
Jacob Bendixen, the Jew (1864 ) : English translation of Jøde.

He published several novels. He also wrote a few dramas, and an autobiography :

- 1845 - En Jøde, published under the pseudonym Adolph Meyer
- 1853–1857 - Hjemløs
- 1865 - Arvingen
- 1867 - Ravnen ("The Raven")
