= Monte Carlo (composer) =

American songwriter

Hans von Holstein, better known as Monte Carlo (14 July 1883 — 9 June 1967), was a Danish-born American Broadway composer and author.

== Life ==
Von Holstein was born in Skamlingsbanken, Gravenstein, Denmark, on 14 July 1883.

He came to the U.S. in 1906 to avoid studying medicine. He changed his name to Hans Carlo, and soon began using Monte Carlo as his name. He became a naturalized US citizen in 1914. He received pre-medical training in Chicago, with songwriting as chief avocation. He started writing music with Alma Sanders, whom he met at Jerome H. Remick's music publishing firm. She eventually became his wife. They collaborated on a number of shows and a large number of songs. He joined the American Society of Composers, Authors and Publishers in 1923.

In 1930, he was living with his wife at 10 Williams Avenue in Mount Vernon, New York. In 1942, he was living at 145 West 55th Street, New York.

After the death of his wife in 1956, he moved to Houston, Texas. There he became vice-president of Carsen Music Publishing, founded by his step-son, Edward C. Benjamin Sr. He died in Houston on June 9, 1967.

== Songs with music or lyrics by Monte Carlo ==
"Little Town in the old County Down"
"Dinny Danny; The Irish Yacki Hula"
"That Tumble-Down Shack in Athlone"
"Every Tear Is a Smile in an Irishman's Heart"
"By the waters of Killarney"
"Just a bit of Irish lace"
"Two Blue Eyes, One Little Green Isle"
"My Home in the County Mayo"
"The Hills of Connemara"
"The Old Wooden Bridge in Athlone"

Several songs became very popular after being recorded by John McCormack in the early 1920s.

== Shows ==
- The Voice of McConnell by George M. Cohan, (1918; supplied songs)
- Tangerine (1921)
- Elsie (1923)
- The Chiffon Girl (1924)
- Bye Bye Barbara (1924)
- Princess April (1924)
- Oh! Oh! Nurse (1925)
- Houseboat on the Styx (1928; supplied songs)
- Mystery Moon (1930)
- Louisiana Lady (1947)
