= Wurman =

Wurman is a Jewish surname of Germanic origin.

== List of persons with the surname ==
- Alex Wurman (born 1966), American composer
- Felix Wurman (1958-2009), American cellist and composer
- Richard Saul Wurman (born 1935), American architect and graphic designer, co-founder of TED Conferences (father of Josh Wurman)
- Joshua Wurman (born 1960), American atmospheric scientist and inventor (son of Richard Saul Wurman)
