= Corsaren =

Danish weekly magazine (1840–1846)

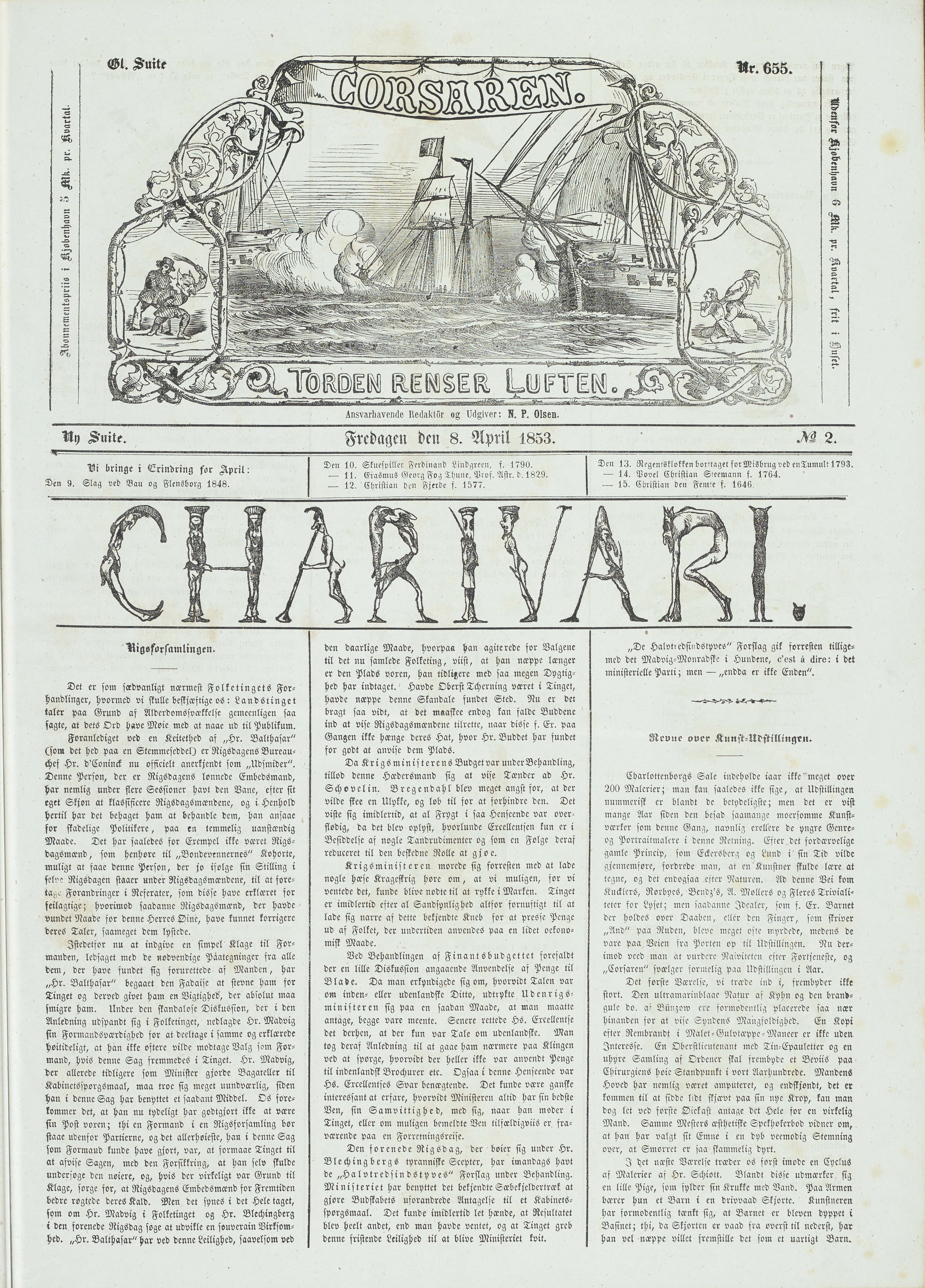
- Frontpage of Corsaren 1853
- Categories: Satirical and political magazine
- Frequency: Weekly
- Publisher: Meïr Aron Goldschmidt
- First issue: 8 October 1840
- Final issue: 1846
- Country: Denmark
- Based in: Copenhagen
- Language: Danish
- OCLC: 23816994

Corsaren (English: The Corsair) was a Danish-language weekly satirical and political magazine published by Meïr Aron Goldschmidt, who also wrote most of its content. The magazine was based in Copenhagen, Denmark, and was published between 1840 and 1846.

== History and profile ==
The first issue of Corsaren was published on 8 October 1840 in Copenhagen. The first six months there were no fewer than six editors due to censorship issues. It was not until the 161st issue three years later that Goldschmidt's name was printed on the back as its publisher. In 1842 Goldschmidt was sentenced to 24 days in prison, a fine of 200 rigsdaler and future censorship.

== The Kierkegaard Affair ==
Corsaren played an important role in the life of Søren Kierkegaard to the point that Kierkegaard could divide his life into a before and after Corsaren. This was a fight that Kierkegaard, to a certain degree, started himself when he under the pseudonym Frater Taciturnus in a five-page article called "The Work of a Traveling Aesthete" ("En omreisende Æsthetikers Virksomhed") in The Fatherland (Fædrelandet) on 27 December 1845 wrote: "Hopefully I will soon appear in The Corsair. It is really hard for a poor writer to be thus singled out in Danish literature that he (assuming we pseudonyms are one) is the only one that is not scolded there." And again on 10 January 1846: "... can I ask to be scolded ...".

Goldschmidt was forced to sell Corsaren in 1846 for 1,500 rigsdaler.

== See also ==
- List of magazines in Denmark
