= Drachmann =

Drachmann or Drachman is a surname. Notable people with the surname include:

Drachmann:

- Holger Drachmann (1846–1908), Danish poet and dramatist
- Aage Gerhardt Drachmann (1891–1980), Danish librarian and historian of science and technology
- Janus Drachmann (born 1988), Danish football player

Drachman:

- Bernard Drachman (1861–1945), American leader of Orthodox Judaism
- Harry A. Drachman (1869–1951), American politician from Arizona
- Mose Drachman (1870–1935), American politician from Arizona
- Theodore S. Drachman (1904–1988), public health official and author
