= List of churches in Brønderslev Municipality =

This list of churches in Brønderslev Municipality lists church buildings in Brønderslev Municipality, Denmark.

== List ==
=== Church of Denmark ===
These churches are part of the Church of Denmark:

Name	Location	Year	Coordinates	Image	Refs
Agersted Church	Agersted	1903	57°12′22″N 10°22′53″E		
Asaa Church	Asaa	1887	57°8′54.24″N 10°23′53.88″E		
Brønderslev Church	Brønderslev	1922	57°16′5.9″N 9°57′11.2″E		
Brønderslev Gamle Kirke	Brønderslev	ca. 1100	57°16′9.11″N 9°57′49.24″E		
Dorf Church	Dorf	1900	57°13′33.39″N 10°17′9.12″E		
Dronninglund Church	Dronninglund	ca. 1200	57°9′17.81″N 10°15′44.24″E		
Hallund Church	Hallund	ca. 1100	57°14′19.32″N 10°6′9.36″E		
Hellevad Church	Klokkerholm	ca. 1150	57°12′46.5″N 10°9′10″E		
Hellum Church	Hellum	ca. 1100	57°15′41.76″N 10°9′39.59″E		
Hjallerup Church	Hjallerup	1903	57°10′6.95″N 10°10′26.39″E		
Jerslev Church	Jerslev	ca. 1100	57°17′0.95″N 10°5′25.44″E		
Melholt Church	Melholt	1911	57°6′8.27″N 10°21′8.99″E		
Mylund Church	Mylund	1926	57°18′51.83″N 10°9′54.72″E		
Serritslev Church	Serritslev	ca. 1150	57°18′59.71″N 9°58′36.71″E		
Stenum Kirke	Stenum	ca. 1100	57°19′15.59″N 9°51′58.42″E		
Thise Church	Thise	Middle Ages	57°17′20.29″N 9°49′7.42″E		
Tolstrup Church	Tolstrup	ca. 1100	57°18′9.72″N 9°54′26.38″E		
Voer Church	Dronninglund	ca. 1100	57°14′25.44″N 10°21′3.6″E		
Ørum Krike	Ørum	ca. 1250	57°11′27.6″N 10°6′14.39″E		
Øster Brønderslev Church	Øster Brønderslev	ca. 1250	57°14′53.88″N 9°59′58.41″E		
Øster Hjermitslev Church	Øster Hjermitslev	1911	57°16′44.04″N 9°52′5.62″E		

=== Independent churches ===
Name	Location	Denomination	Year	Coordinates	Image	Refs
Brønderslev International Apostolic Church	Brønderslev	Apostolic Church of Denmark		57°16′6″N 9°57′40.8″E		
Jerslev Advent Church	Jerslev	Seventh-day Adventist Church	1963	57°16′58.52″N 10°5′19.66″E		
Vesterkirken	Stenum	Det Danske Missionsforbund (International Federation of Free Evangelical Churches)	2000	57°19′18.4″N 9°51′28.4″E		
