= 2025 Brønderslev municipal election =

Municipal election in Denmark

- 18 November 2025

All 27 seats to the Brønderslev municipal council 14 seats needed for a majority
- Turnout: 20,255 (70.9%) ▲1.0%
	First party	Second party	Third party
	V	A	Æ
Party	Venstre	Social Democrats	Denmark Democrats
Last election	12 seats, 39.9%	8 seats, 30.3%	Did not stand
Seats won	11	6	2
Seat change	▼1	▼2	▲2
Popular vote	7,408	4,263	1,836
Percentage	37.1%	21.4%	9.2%
Swing	▼2.8%	▼8.9%	New
	Fourth party	Fifth party	Sixth party
	F	J	C
Party	Green Left	Borgerlisten	Conservatives
Last election	1 seat, 2.6%	1 seat, 6.0%	2 seats, 7.8%
Seats won	2	2	2
Seat change	▲1	▲1	0
Popular vote	1,791	1,348	1,319
Percentage	9.0%	6.8%	6.6%
Swing	▲6.3%	▲0.8%	▼1.2%
	Seventh party	Eighth party	Ninth party
	O	Ø	D
Party	Danish People's Party	Red-Green Alliance	New Right
Last election	1 seat, 4.3%	1 seat, 2.5%	1 seat, 3.5%
Seats won	1	1	0
Seat change	0	0	▼1
Popular vote	877	617	113
Percentage	4.4%	3.1%	0.6%
Swing	▲0.1%	▲0.6%	▼2.9%
Mayor before election
Mikael Klitgaard
Venstre
Mayor after election
Mikael Klitgaard
Venstre

The 2025 Brønderslev Municipal election was held on November 18, 2025, in the Danish city of Brønderslev, to elect the 27 members to sit in the regional council for the Brønderslev Municipal council, in the period of 2026 to 2029. Mikael Klitgaard would secure the mayoral position, despite Venstre losing a seat.

== Background ==
In the 2021 election, Mikael Klitgaard from Venstre won his third consecutive term as mayor of Brønderslev Municipality. In June of 2024, the party decided to put him forward as their mayoral candidate once again.

== Electoral system ==
For elections to Danish municipalities, a number varying from 9 to 31 are chosen to be elected to the municipal council. The seats are then allocated using the D'Hondt method and a closed list proportional representation. Brønderslev Municipality had 27 seats in 2025.

Unlike in Danish General Elections, in elections to municipal councils, electoral alliances are allowed.

== Electoral alliances ==
=== Electoral Alliance 1 ===
Party		Political alignment
B	Social Liberals	Centre to Centre-left
C	Conservatives	Centre-right
J	Borgerlisten	Local politics
M	Moderates	Centre to Centre-right

=== Electoral Alliance 2 ===
Party		Political alignment
D	New Right	Far-right
O	Danish People's Party	Right-wing to Far-right
V	Venstre	Centre-right
Æ	Denmark Democrats	Right-wing to Far-right

=== Electoral Alliance 3 ===
Party		Political alignment
F	Green Left	Centre-left to Left-wing
Ø	Red-Green Alliance	Left-wing to Far-Left

== Results by polling station ==
Division	A	B	C	D	F	J	M	O	V	Æ	Ø
Division	%	%	%	%	%	%	%	%	%	%	%
Agersted	44.3	6.1	2.6	1.4	7.0	3.5	0.2	5.9	16.6	10.8	1.6
Asaa	28.1	2.7	3.0	0.3	6.0	9.7	1.2	6.1	30.4	9.2	3.1
Dronninglund	22.3	1.7	4.6	0.5	10.2	17.5	0.2	3.5	30.0	6.9	2.6
Flauenskjold	8.8	1.0	1.6	0.6	2.7	1.6	0.4	21.4	50.8	7.4	3.8
Hjallerup	17.0	0.5	3.5	0.3	7.4	21.7	0.5	3.4	37.5	6.7	1.5
Klokkerholm	17.9	1.0	2.4	0.4	7.1	4.2	0.4	5.5	44.9	11.9	4.3
Brønderslev Hallen	24.2	0.7	9.3	0.6	11.3	0.8	1.6	3.4	36.6	7.8	3.7
Stenum	17.0	0.6	4.8	0.6	8.8	0.0	0.0	2.8	48.6	13.9	2.8
Thise	27.0	1.0	6.2	0.4	6.0	0.6	0.4	2.7	41.6	11.5	2.7
Ø. Brønderslev	19.7	0.8	14.2	1.5	8.7	0.6	1.1	2.9	37.2	10.3	3.1
Hallund	18.6	0.6	9.9	0.9	9.0	0.6	0.3	5.1	36.8	15.3	3.0
Jerslev	12.5	0.7	8.2	0.8	7.1	0.5	0.5	5.8	40.8	19.8	3.3
Serritslev	11.8	0.2	4.7	0.2	6.1	1.6	0.4	1.4	54.7	14.8	4.1

== Results ==
Party		Votes	%	+/-	Seats	+/-
Brønderslev Municipality
V	Venstre	7,408	37.11	-2.83	11	-1
A	Social Democrats	4,263	21.35	-8.93	6	-2
Æ	Denmark Democrats	1,836	9.20	New	2	New
F	Green Left	1,791	8.97	+6.34	2	+1
J	Borgerlisten	1,348	6.75	+0.76	2	+1
C	Conservatives	1,319	6.61	-1.24	2	0
O	Danish People's Party	877	4.39	+0.06	1	0
Ø	Red-Green Alliance	617	3.09	+0.55	1	0
B	Social Liberals	213	1.07	-0.15	0	0
M	Moderates	178	0.89	New	0	New
D	New Right	113	0.57	-2.89	0	-1
Total		19,963	100	N/A	27	N/A
Invalid votes		53	0.19	+0.02		
Blank votes		239	0.84	+0.19		
Turnout		20,255	70.95	+1.01		
Source: valg.dk

== Opinion polls ==
Polling firm	Fieldwork date	Sample size	V	A	C	J	O	D	F	Ø	B	M	Æ	Others	Lead
Epinion	4 Sep - 13 Oct 2025	505	37.6	25.4	6.6	–	5.4	–	7.6	3.4	0.7	1.3	10.2	1.8	12.2
2024 european parliament election	9 Jun 2024		18.2	19.9	6.3	–	6.1	–	10.9	4.0	3.9	4.9	18.5	–	1.4
2022 general election	1 Nov 2022		14.3	36.1	4.0	–	2.2	4.0	4.8	1.8	1.6	5.8	17.3	–	18.8
2021 regional election	16 Nov 2021		28.6	35.7	15.4	–	4.4	4.5	3.3	3.0	2.3	–	–	–	7.1
2021 municipal election	16 Nov 2021		39.9 (12)	30.3 (8)	7.8 (2)	6.0 (1)	4.3 (1)	3.5 (1)	2.6 (1)	2.5 (1)	1.2 (0)	–	–	–	9.6
