= 2021 Brønderslev municipal election =

← 2017	16 November 2021	2025 →

All 27 seats to the Brønderslev Municipal Council 14 seats needed for a majority
- Turnout: 19,789 (69.9%) ▼2.3pp
	First party	Second party	Third party
	V	A	C
Party	Venstre	Social Democrats	Conservatives
Last election	10 seats, 34.1%	11 seats, 32.2%	2 seats, 8.5%
Seats won	12	8	2
Seat change	▲2	▼3	0
Popular vote	7,810	5,923	1,534
Percentage	39.9%	30.3%	7.8%
Swing	▲5.8%	▼1.9%	▼0.7%
	Fourth party	Fifth party	Sixth party
	J	O	D
Party	Borgerlisten	Danish People's Party	New Right
Last election	2 seats, 6.6%	2 seats, 8.3%	Did not stand
Seats won	1	1	1
Seat change	▼1	▼1	▲1
Popular vote	1,171	848	675
Percentage	6.0%	4.3%	3.5%
Swing	▼0.6%	▼4.0%	New
	Seventh party	Eighth party
	F	Ø
Party	Green Left	Red–Green Alliance
Last election	0 seats, 2.8%	0 seats, 2.7%
Seats won	1	1
Seat change	▲1	▲1
Popular vote	514	496
Percentage	2.6%	2.5%
Swing	▼0.2%	▼0.2%
Mayor before election
Mikael Klitgaard
Venstre
Mayor after election
Mikael Klitgaard
Venstre

In 2014 Mikael Klitgaard, from Venstre, became mayor of Brønderslev Municipality. He was re-elected in 2017, despite losing 2.5% of the vote and 1 seat. However, Venstre increased their vote share by 5.8%, and gained 2 seats for this election. On 19 November, Mikael Klitgaard secured a 3rd period as mayor, after a constitution was agreed upon by Venstre, Conservatives, New Right, Borgerlisten (Note: Local party in Brønderslev) and Danish People's Party.

== Electoral system ==
For elections to Danish municipalities, a number varying from 9 to 31 are chosen to be elected to the municipal council. The seats are then allocated using the D'Hondt method and a closed list proportional representation. Brønderslev Municipality had 27 seats in 2021

Unlike in Danish General Elections, in elections to municipal councils, electoral alliances are allowed.

== Electoral alliances ==
=== Electoral Alliance 1 ===
Party		Political alignment
D	New Right	Right-wing to Far-right
O	Danish People's Party	Right-wing to Far-right
V	Venstre	Centre-right

=== Electoral Alliance 2 ===
Party		Political alignment
B	Social Liberals	Centre to Centre-left
F	Green Left	Centre-left to Left-wing
G	Vegan Party	Single-issue
Ø	Red–Green Alliance	Left-wing to Far-Left

=== Electoral Alliance 3 ===
Party		Political alignment
J	Borgerlisten	Local politics
K	Christian Democrats	Centre to Centre-right

=== Electoral Alliance 4 ===
Party		Political alignment
C	Conservatives	Centre-right
I	Liberal Alliance	Centre-right to Right-wing

== Results by polling station ==
Polling Station	A	B	C	D	F	G	I	K	O	V	Ø	J
Polling Station	%	%	%	%	%	%	%	%	%	%	%	%
Agersted	16.5	1.4	3.8	7.4	1.4	0.0	0.2	0.0	3.6	41.5	2.2	22.0
Asaa	46.1	0.6	3.0	3.8	2.1	0.3	0.0	0.7	3.9	31.6	2.9	4.9
Dronninglund	26.6	2.4	5.5	2.4	1.8	1.3	0.5	0.5	2.6	36.6	2.4	17.3
Flauenskjold	16.3	1.4	4.1	5.7	2.5	1.0	0.2	0.2	17.8	44.3	2.2	4.5
Hjallerup	26.4	0.8	4.8	3.2	2.0	0.6	0.3	0.8	2.6	42.6	1.9	14.1
Klokkerholm	21.6	0.5	4.4	3.9	1.8	1.9	0.6	0.6	4.4	52.7	2.5	5.1
Brønderslev	35.4	1.2	10.7	2.5	3.3	0.5	1.0	0.2	4.0	37.6	2.7	0.9
Stenum	47.8	0.5	5.4	4.4	3.9	0.0	0.5	0.0	2.6	33.2	1.8	0.0
Thise	37.4	0.4	6.3	5.7	1.5	0.4	1.2	1.0	3.8	39.5	1.9	0.7
Ø. Brønderslev	28.7	2.9	22.1	3.7	4.7	0.7	0.5	0.5	2.0	31.0	2.3	1.1
Hallund	21.8	0.0	8.7	7.0	2.5	0.3	1.1	0.6	5.0	49.3	3.4	0.3
Jerslev	21.4	0.6	5.8	6.2	2.4	0.8	0.2	0.5	9.2	47.6	3.4	2.0
Serritslev	23.2	0.4	4.4	3.6	2.5	0.2	0.2	1.0	3.6	56.6	3.8	0.6

== Results ==
Party		Votes	%	+/-	Seats	+/-
Brønderslev Municipality
V	Venstre	7,810	39.94	+5.80	12	+2
A	Social Democrats	5,923	30.29	-1.95	8	-3
C	Conservatives	1,534	7.84	-0.69	2	0
J	Borgerlisten	1,171	5.99	-0.61	1	-1
O	Danish People's Party	848	4.34	-3.94	1	-1
D	New Right	675	3.45	New	1	New
F	Green Left	514	2.63	-0.15	1	+1
Ø	Red-Green Alliance	496	2.54	-0.14	1	+1
B	Social Liberals	238	1.22	-0.83	0	0
G	Vegan Party	138	0.71	New	0	New
I	Liberal Alliance	119	0.61	-0.27	0	0
K	Christian Democrats	90	0.46	-0.07	0	0
Total		19,556	100	N/A	27	N/A
Invalid votes		46	0.16	+0.10		
Blank votes		186	0.66	-0.13		
Turnout		19,788	69.94	-2.89		
Source: valg.dk
