= Charles Stanley Group =

UK investment management company

Charles Stanley & Co. Limited
- Type: Privately held company
- Industry: Wealth management
- Founded: 1792
- Headquarters: Ropemaker Place; London, EC2Y; United Kingdom
- Key people: Paul Abberley (CEO)
- Revenue: £155.2 million (2019)
- Operating income: £9.5 million (2019)
- Net income: £11.0 million (2019)
- Number of employees: 850 (2019)
- Website: charles-stanley.co.uk

Charles Stanley & Co. Limited is a UK-based investment management company, providing wealth management services to private clients, charities and smaller institutions. Established in 1792, it was one of the oldest firms on the London Stock Exchange.

== History ==
A subsidiary of Charles Stanley & Co. Ltd., was first listed on the London Stock Exchange in 1852. The company itself was incorporated and listed in 1896. It offers four core services: wealth management, financial planning, an online execution-only platform, and asset management.

== Operations ==
In March 2019, it reported £24.1 billion of investments under management and administration.

The board of directors is chaired by Sandy Kinney Pritchard, who was appointed to the position in February 2024. Sir David Howard, stepped down as chair in 2024 and he was originally chief executive in 2014. Paul Abberley steps down as chief executive in April 2025. Kim Jensen replaces Paul as interim chief executive in April 2025 (subject to approval).

In 2019, Charles Stanley reported revenues of £155.2 million.

In July 2021, the company was sold to Raymond James Financial for £279 million.
