= Øster Brønderslev =

- Village
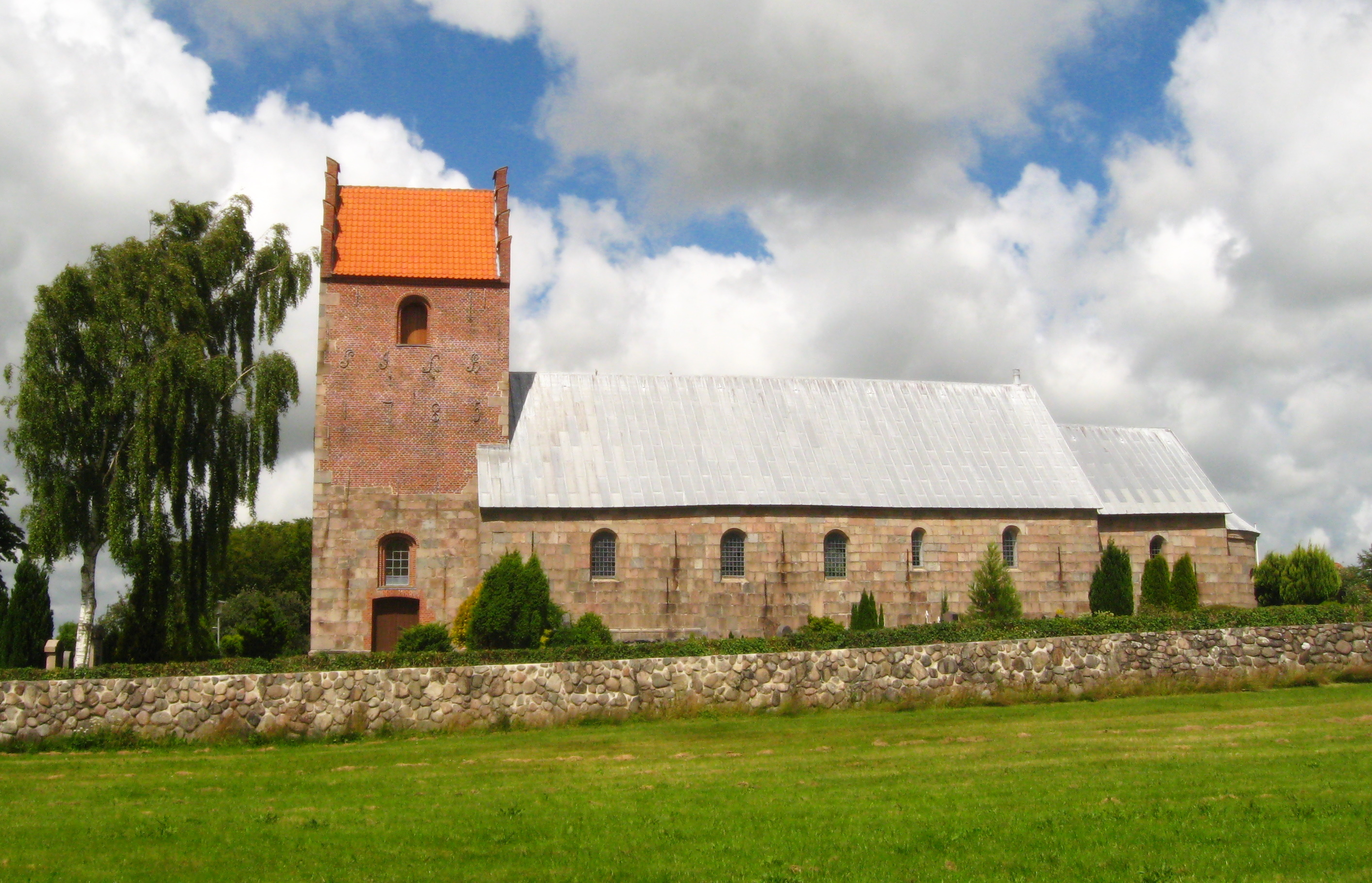
- Øster Brønderslev Church

- Location within North Jutland Region Location within Denmark
- Coordinates: 57°14′56″N 9°59′46″E
- Country: Denmark
- Region: North Jutland Region
- Municipality: Brønderslev

Population (2026)
  - Total: 967

Øster Brønderslev is a village, with a population of 967 (1 January 2026), in Brønderslev Municipality, North Jutland Region in Denmark, 1 km east of exit 7 Brønderslev S at the Hirtshals Motorway, the danish part of the European route E39.

Øster Brønderslev is situated 4 km southeast of central Brønderslev and 2 km southeast of the outskirts of the town, 25 km north of Aalborg and 27 km south of Hjørring.

Øster Brønderslev Church is located in the village.
