= Naja Abelsen =

Greenlandic painter and illustrator

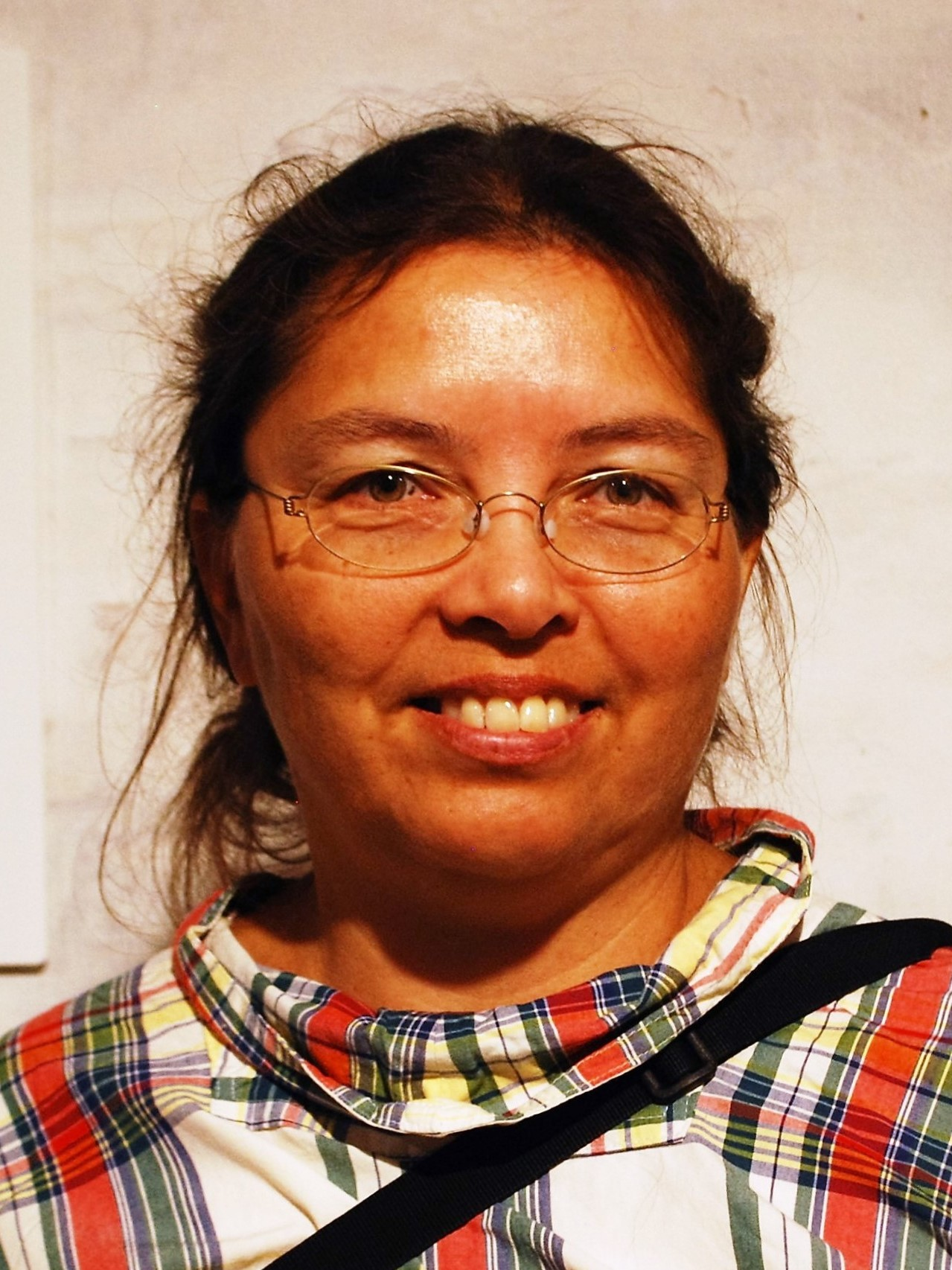
- Born: 1964 (age 61–62); Brønderslev
- Education: Kunsthøjskolen i Holbæk; Billedskolen (1987-1989); Danish Design School (1990-1996)

Naja Abelsen (born 1964) is a Danish-Greenlandic painter and illustrator. Much of her art is inspired by the myths and sagas of Greenland. In addition to her work as a book illustrator, she has designed 18 stamps for Post Greenland.

== Biography ==
Born on 19 April 1964 in Brønderslev, Abelsen is the daughter of a Greenlandic father, the teacher Adolf Konrad Boas Henrik Abelsen, a teacher, and a Danish mother, Kirsten Fokdal, manager of an old people's home. As a child, she spent nine years in Greenland's Qaqortoq where she was exposed to the cultures of both Denmark and Greenland. After attending Kunsthøjskolen i Holbæk (Holbæk's art folk school), she spend two years at Billedskolen in Copenhagen (1987–89) followed by six years at the Danish Design School (1990–96).

Her art is inspired by the people and animals of Greenland, as can be seen in her book illustrations and her work on logos and postage stamps.

In March 2017, Abelsen who has lived on the island of Ærø since 2001 opened a new gallery on Vestergade in Ærøskøbing where many of her works can be seen.

== Selection of books illustrated by Naja Abelsen ==
- Kästner, Erich (2008). Das doppelte Lottchen. Easy Readers. ISBN 9788723906397.
- Kappel Jensen, Gry (2010). Slædehundenes suk. Turbine. ISBN 9788770902687.
- Naidoo, Beverley (1999). Chain of Fire. Aschehoug. ISBN 9788711091326.
- Petersen, H.C. (2001). Den fiffige ravn - og andre beretninger om det levende i mit land. Atuakkiorfik. ISBN 9788755815582.
- Rasmussen, Knud (2000). Myter og Sagn fra Grønland. Sesam. ISBN 978-87-11-13259-3.
- Rasmussen, Knud (2016). Myter og Sagn fra Grønland: Anden samling. Lindhardt og Ringhof. ISBN 978-87-11-52791-7.
- Stephensen, Birgit (1989). Aura og farver. Borgen. ISBN 9788741888248.
