= Brønderslev Gymnasium og HF =

Danish secondary school

Coordinates: 57.2787°N 9.9425°E

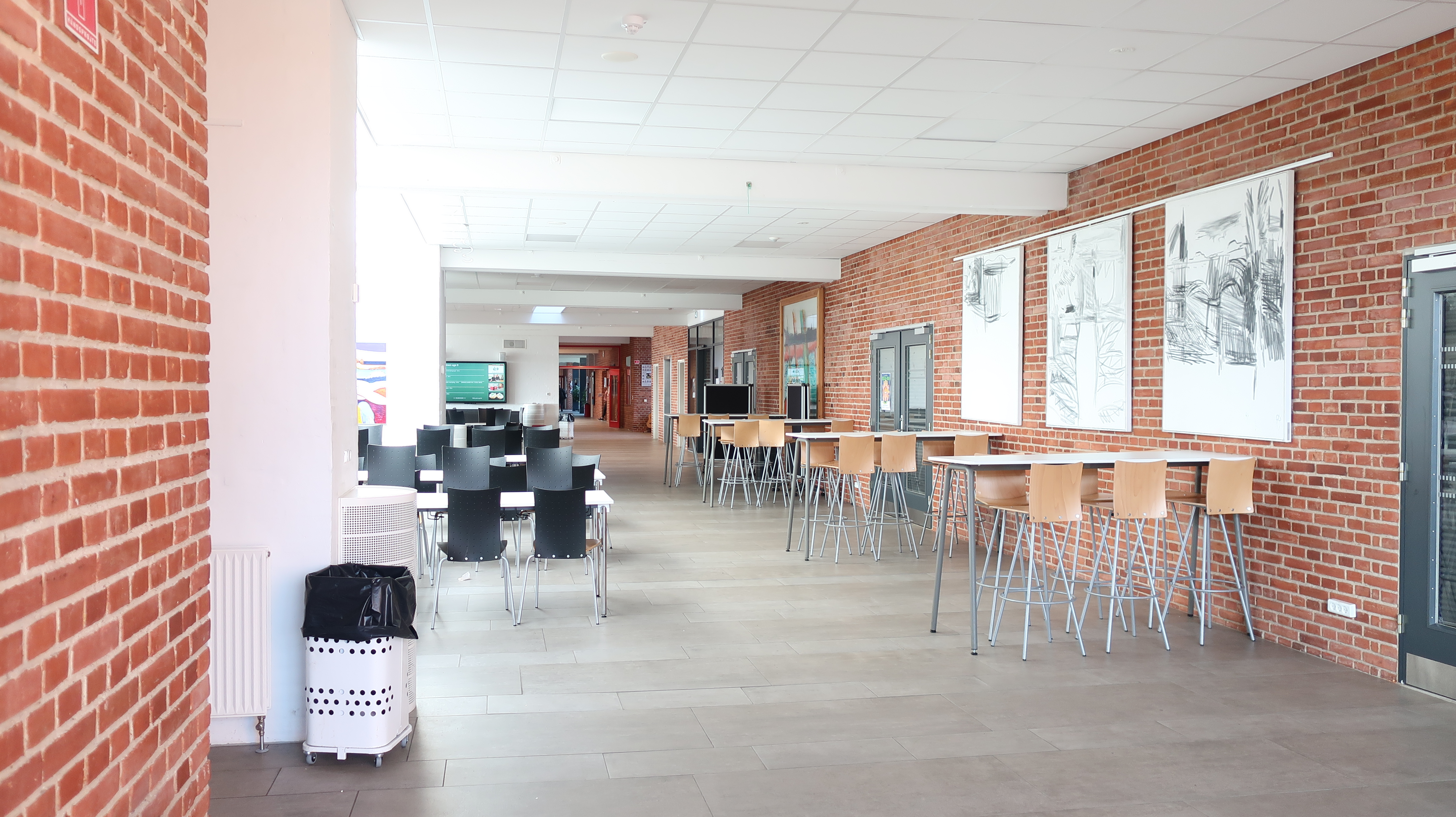
- Brønderslev Gymnasium Canteen

Location
- Islands Allé 20 9700 Brønderslev DK; Brønderslev, Denmark

Information
- Established: 1973
- Rector: Per Knudsen
- Enrollment: 550
- Language: Danish
- Phone number: +45 9882 2722
- Website: www.brslev-gym.dk

Brønderslev Gymnasium og HF-kursus is secondary school in Brønderslev, Denmark. The school offers gymnasium and Higher Preparatory Examination programs and has a student body of around 550.

The gymnasium was first proposed by the Brønderslev city council in 1958, though students were not admitted until 1973. The school had temporary premises at the city's former technical school until 1974, when the current premises were inaugurated. The gymnasium was originally owned and run by North Jutland County until its abolishment in 2007, and has since been independent.

Adjacent to the gymnasium's main doors, a statue called "Månedyret" (the moon animal) is displayed. The statue was donated in 1998 by its sculptor, Claus Ørntoft.

In March 2020, the campus closed due to the coronavirus pandemic. The school reopened in April 2020 with social distancing measures in place.

== Rectors ==
- Jesper Falsig Pedersen, 1973-1992
- Egon Jensen, 1992-2011
- Per Knudsen, 2012–present

== Notable alumni ==
- Hanne Vibeke Holst – Author (1977)
- Martin Bech - Politician (2009)
- Søren Kjeldsen - Golfer
