= Paul Abberley =

English businessman (born 1959)

Paul Andrew Abberley
- Born: 1959 (age 66–67)
- Education: Keble College
- Occupation: Chief executive of Charles Stanley Group
- Known for: Chief executive of Charles Stanley Group (2014–2025)

Paul Andrew Abberley (born 1959) is a British investment manager. He was chief executive of the wealth manager Charles Stanley Group from 2014 to 2025, including after its acquisition by Raymond James Financial. He was previously head of investments and interim chief executive at Aviva Investors.

== Education ==
Abberley studied philosophy, politics and economics at Keble College, Oxford.

== Career ==
=== Aviva Investors ===
In 2008, Abberley joined Aviva Investors to head its active portfolio management business. In May 2012, he became interim chief executive after the departure of Alain Dromer. He later returned to his role as head of investments and left the company in December 2013.
