= Hjallerup market =

Market in Hjallerup, northeast of Aalborg, Jutland, Denmark

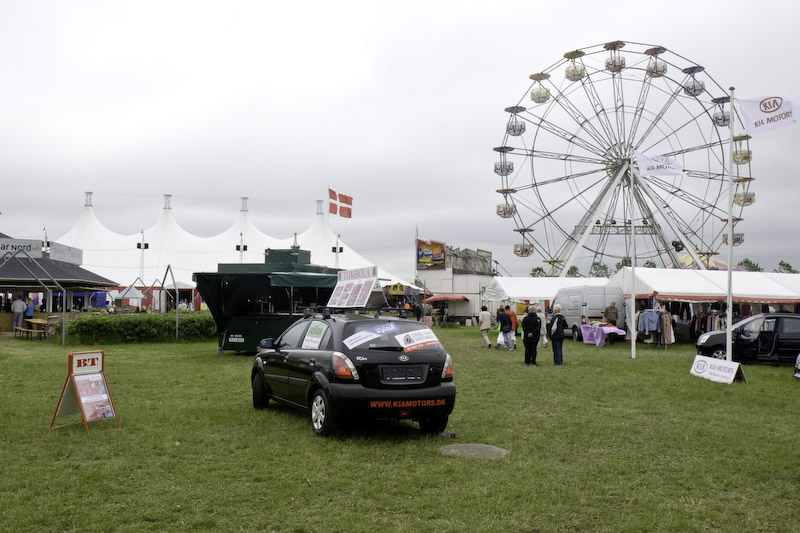
Hjallerup Market, with horse trading, amusements and sales of different merchandise

Hjallerup market is a market in Hjallerup, about 20 kilometres (12 mi) northeast of Aalborg, Jutland, Denmark. Held since 1744, it is one of the oldest and largest markets in Denmark and is the largest horse market in Europe. Held for three days in the beginning of June, it annually attracts more than 200,000 people and 1200 horses.
