= Jerslev, Denmark =

Jerslev
- Town
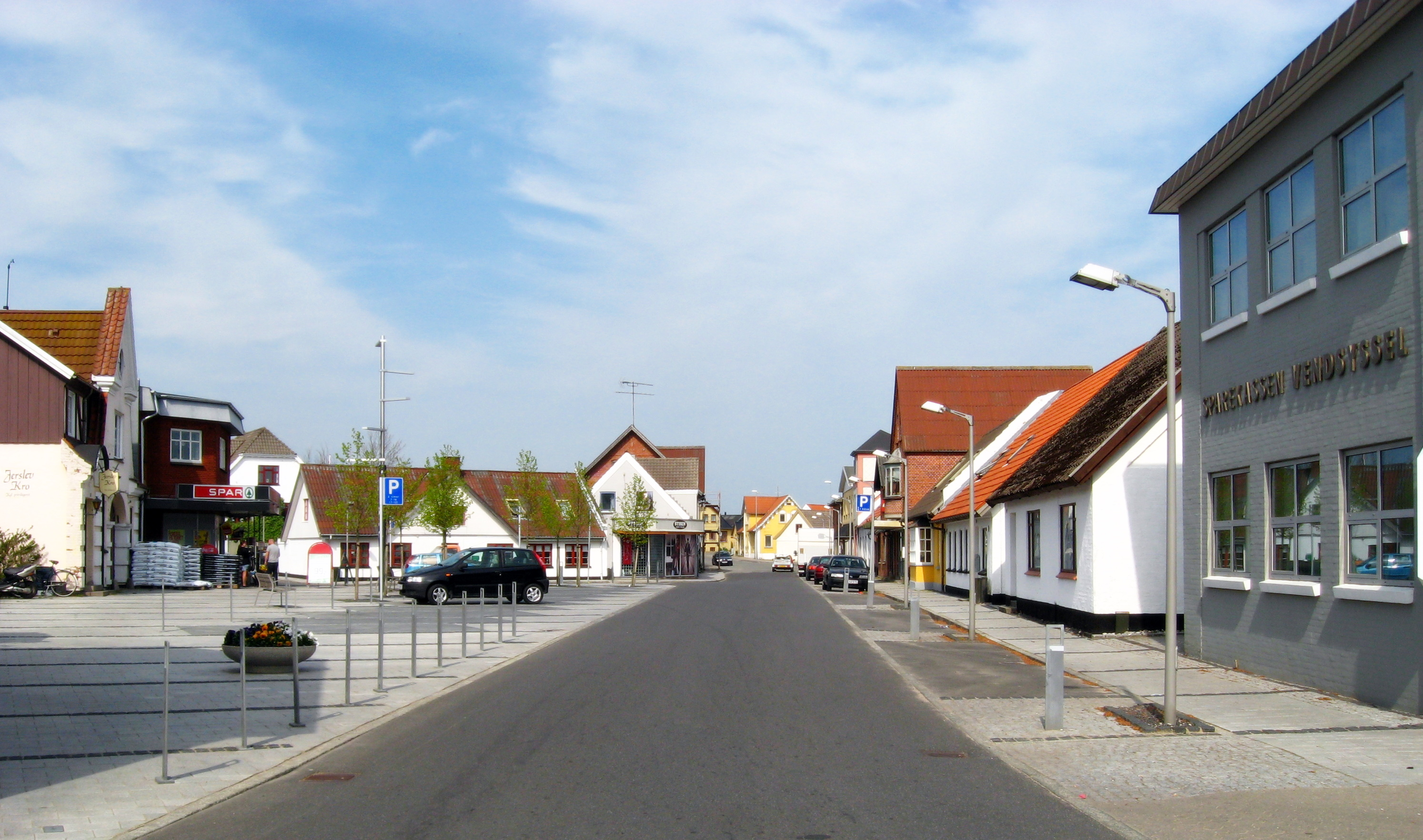

- Location in North Jutland Region Jerslev (Denmark)
- Coordinates: 57.28588°N 10.09333°E
- Country: Denmark
- Region: North Jutland Region
- Municipality: Brønderslev Municipality

Area
  - Urban: 0.77 km^{2} (0.30 sq mi)

Population (2026)
  - Urban: 879
  - Urban density: 1,100/km^{2} (3,000/sq mi)
- Time zone: UTC+1
- Postal code: DK-9740 Jerslev J
- Website: http://9740.dk/

Jerslev is a small town in central Vendsyssel, Denmark. The town, which is part of Brønderslev Municipality, is located in the North Jutland Region. As of 2026, it has a population of 879.

Every summer, Jerslev Marked, one of the largest market festivals in the region of its kind, is held. The town has a primary school, kindergarten, and a small variety of shops.

== History ==
During the Middle Ages, Vendsyssel was a single syssel: an administrative district which was further divided into Herreds. In 1231, one of these herreds was recorded as Jarlsefheret, a name which implies that the town had been the seat of an earl (Danish: jarl). This name eventually evolved into its modern Danish version: Jerslev Herred. Although the town of Jerslev was evidently the original seat of the regions earl, by the 17th century the administrative head of the region had taken up permanent residence at another manor within a nearby town.

During the Thirty Years' War, this region was occupied by Swedish troops who enforced their supremacy and extorted Jerslev Herred through threat of arson, plunder, and "other inconveniences of war". Several of the towns farms and houses were destroyed or burned. Jerslev Herred once covered a significant portion of central Vendsyssel and functioned as its own local government. By 1835, the administrative region was completely dissolved into the neighboring Herreds of Børglum and Dronninglund, though the town retained its name.

Before the construction of a railroad through the neighboring city of Brønderslev, Jerslev was located at a heavily trafficked crossroads and in 1711 there were four substantial inns in the town. This did not last, however, and by 1733 all of these inns had closed. For the time being, Jerslev remained a small farming village with relatively few houses. In 1920, there were around 20 farm estates within the town's current borders, but by 1950 most of these estates had been divided into building plots. By 2006, none remained in use for agricultural purposes.

Jerslev expanded during the interwar period, though growth plateaued after World War II. In 1925 the town had a population of 592 and by 1940, 742 people lived in Jerslev. During the interwar period the majority of the population made their livelihoods through farming. A 1930 survey on the employment of Jerslev's population found that 205 worked on farms, 187 in industrial work, 71 in trade business, 32 in other forms of business, 29 in transportation, and 51 in housework, while 64 were recorded as being unemployed. During the occupation of Denmark of World War II, approximately 150 German soldiers were quartered at the inn and the town hall. One of such soldiers attempted to defect in the forest near Klæstrup. Many residents were involved, and when he was discovered several were arrested and served sentences.

As part of the 1970 Danish Municipal Reforms, Jerslev Municipality (Danish: Jerslev Kommune) was merged with surrounding regions to form Brønderslev Municipality. Because there may not be more than one street with a given name within the same municipality, many of the streets in Jerslev had to be renamed. As a result, the streets are today mainly named after various plants and islands.

== Religion ==
=== Jerslev Church ===
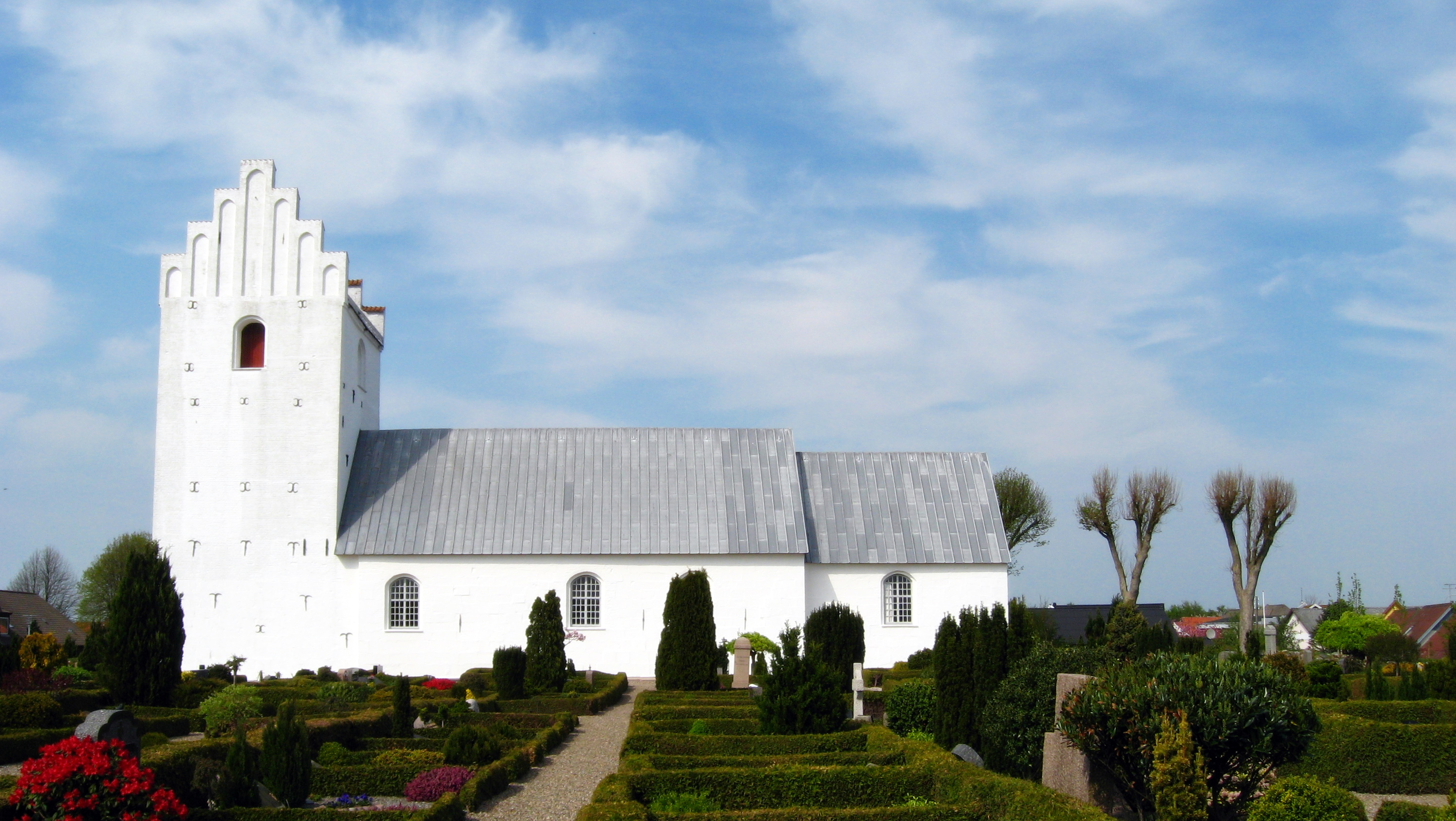
Jerslev Church

The oldest portion of Jerslev Church (Danish: Jerslev Kirke) was constructed between 1100 and 1200 in Romanesque style. It is possible that a wooden church had existed on the same site prior to its construction, though this is not certain.

Like most churches during this period, it was privately owned. In its early history, it was owned by Hans Mühlheim and Sten Handorf, among others. It became independent between 1926 and 1927, though the structure itself had by that time become rather dilapidated due to neglect. The church underwent major renovation and expansion in 1927; the ceiling and pews were replaced, heating and electricity were installed, and a tower room and chapel were added to the existing structure. Further renovations to maintain the church took place in 1950 and 1999.

Today, Jerslev Church is part of the Church of Denmark. It is the parish church of Jerslev Sogn within the Diocese of Aalborg.

=== Jerslev Adventist Church ===
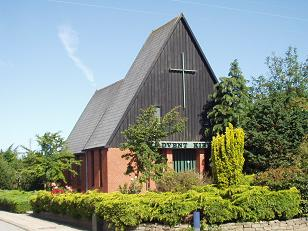
Jerslev Adventist Church (Danish: Jerslev Adventistkirke), 2005

In 1877, the Danish-American minister, John G. Matteson returned to Denmark to organise a Seventh Day Adventist congregation in Vendsyssel. By 1880, a congregation of around 20 people had emerged near Jerslev. The congregation established a primary school in Dronninglund in 1883. In 1962, the congregation of around 54 members purchased a plot of land in Jerslev to build a church. Today, the church shares a priest with the Seventh Day Adventist Church in Østervrå.
