= Kim Jensen =

Danish handball player and coach (born 1961)

Kim Jensen (born October 24, 1961, in Brønderslev, Denmark) is former assistant national coach for the Danish women's national handball team. He was an active handballer in Brønderslev IF. He scored 91 goals and played 84 national games for the Danish men's national team. He has been an assistant for the head coaches Ulrik Wilbek, Brian Lyngholm and Jan Pytlick (two periods). His contract expired after the Olympic tournament in 2012.
