= Klokkerholm =

- Village
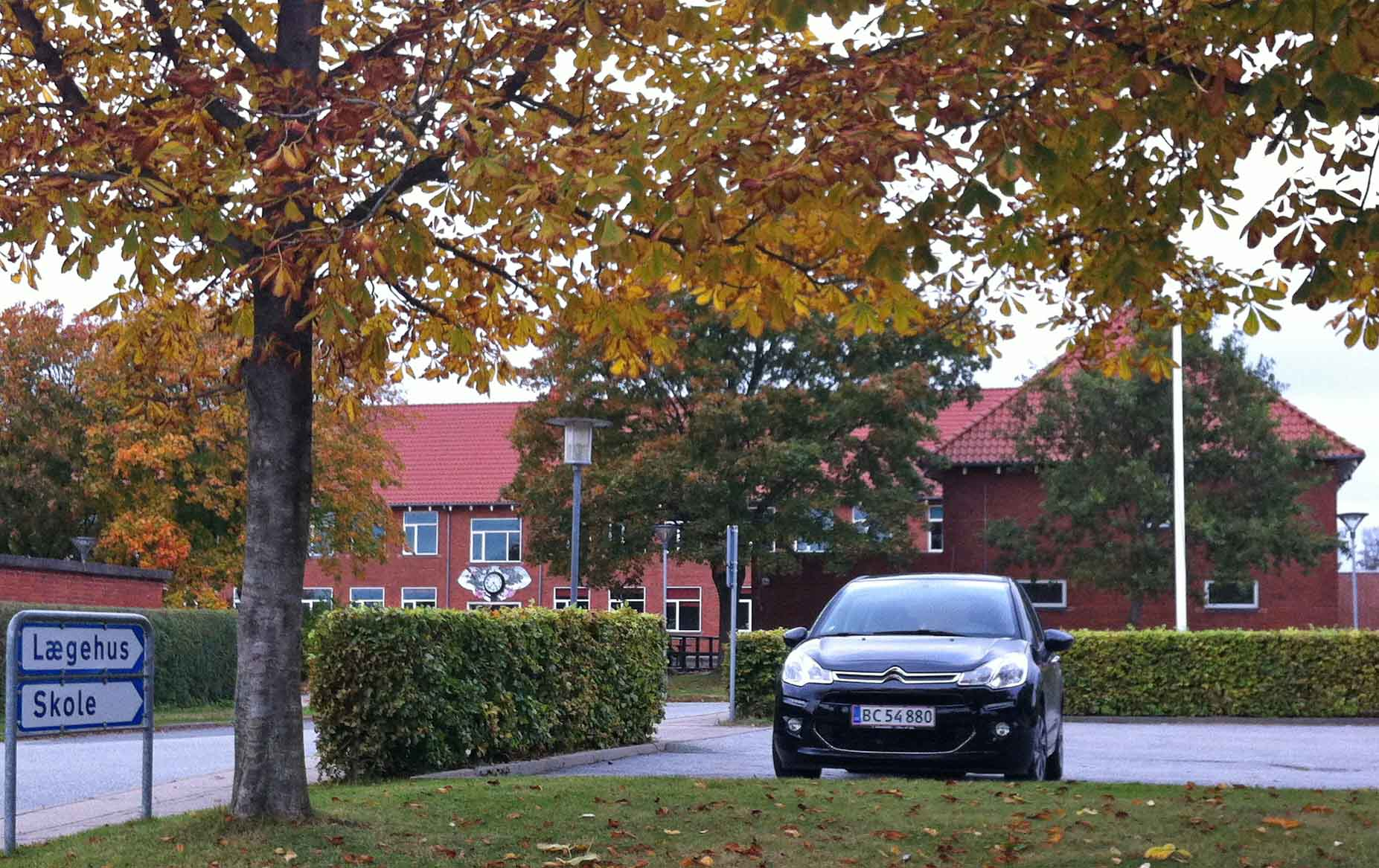
- Klokkerholm School

- Location within North Jutland Region Location within Denmark
- Coordinates: 57°12′44″N 10°9′13″E
- Country: Denmark
- Region: North Jutland Region
- Municipality: Brønderslev
- Parish: Hellevad Parish

Population (2026)
  - Total: 893

Klokkerholm is a village, with a population of 893 (1 January 2026), in Brønderslev Municipality, North Jutland Region in Denmark. It is located 6 km north of Hjallerup, 26 km northeast of Aalborg, 38 km southwest of Frederikshavn and 17 km east of Brønderslev.

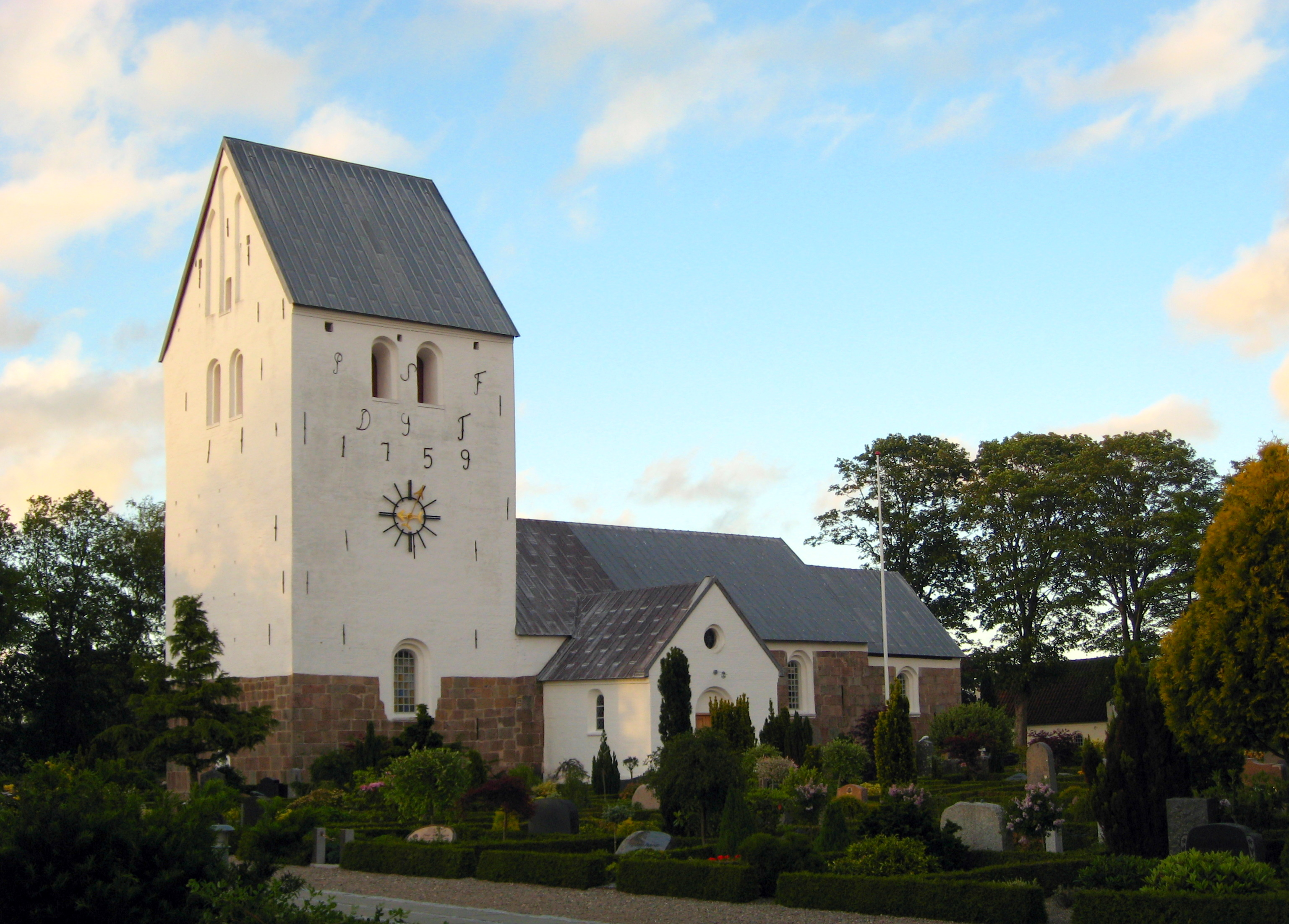
Hellevad Church in Klokkerholm

Hellevad Church from the 12th century is located in Klokkerholm.

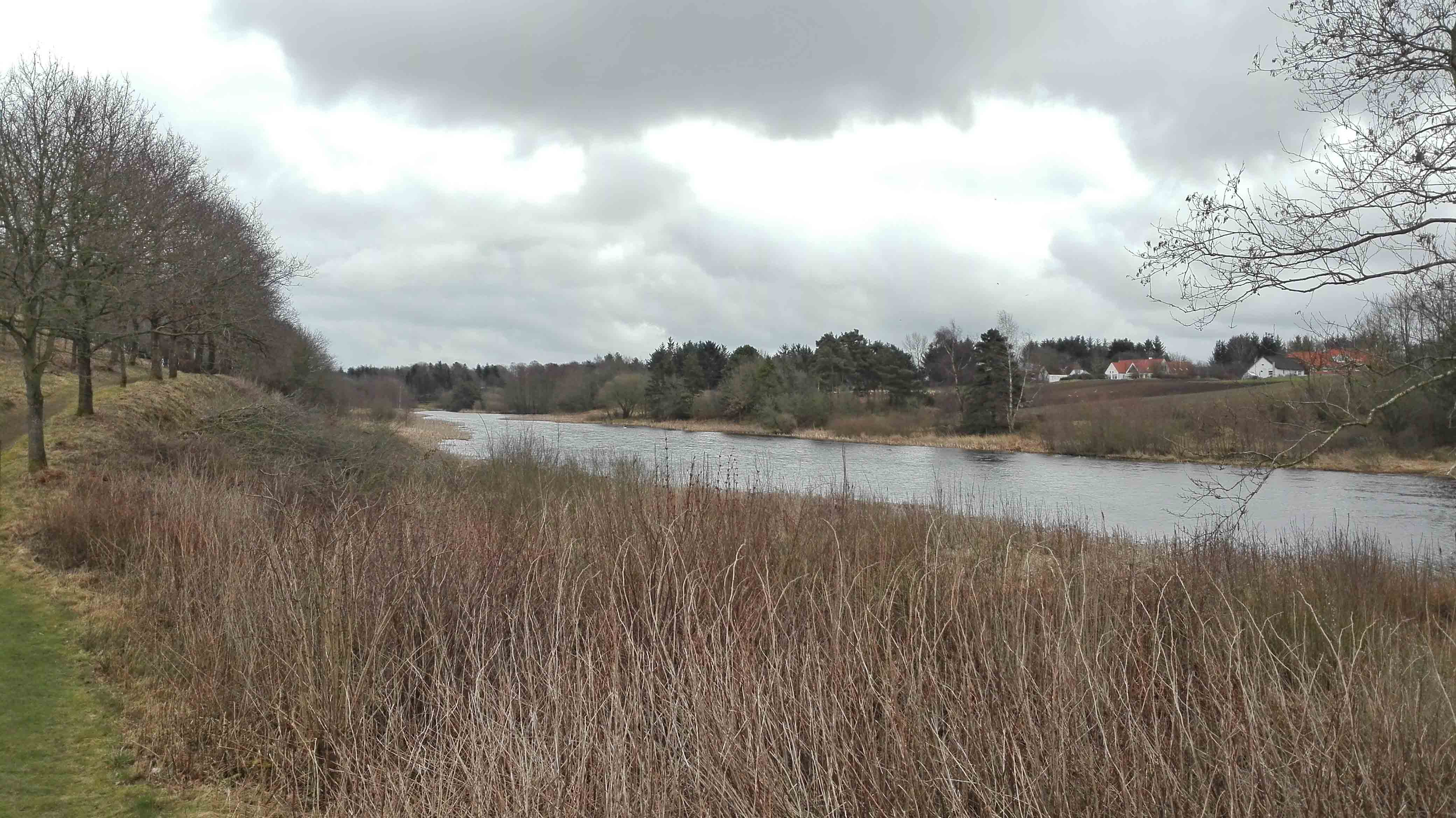
Klokkerholm Møllesø

Klokkerholm Møllesø, the largest natural lake in Vendsyssel with an area of approx. 10 hectare, is located on the northeastern outskirts of the village.
