= Brønderslev Church =

Coordinates: 57°16′06″N 9°57′11″E

- Brønderslev Kirke
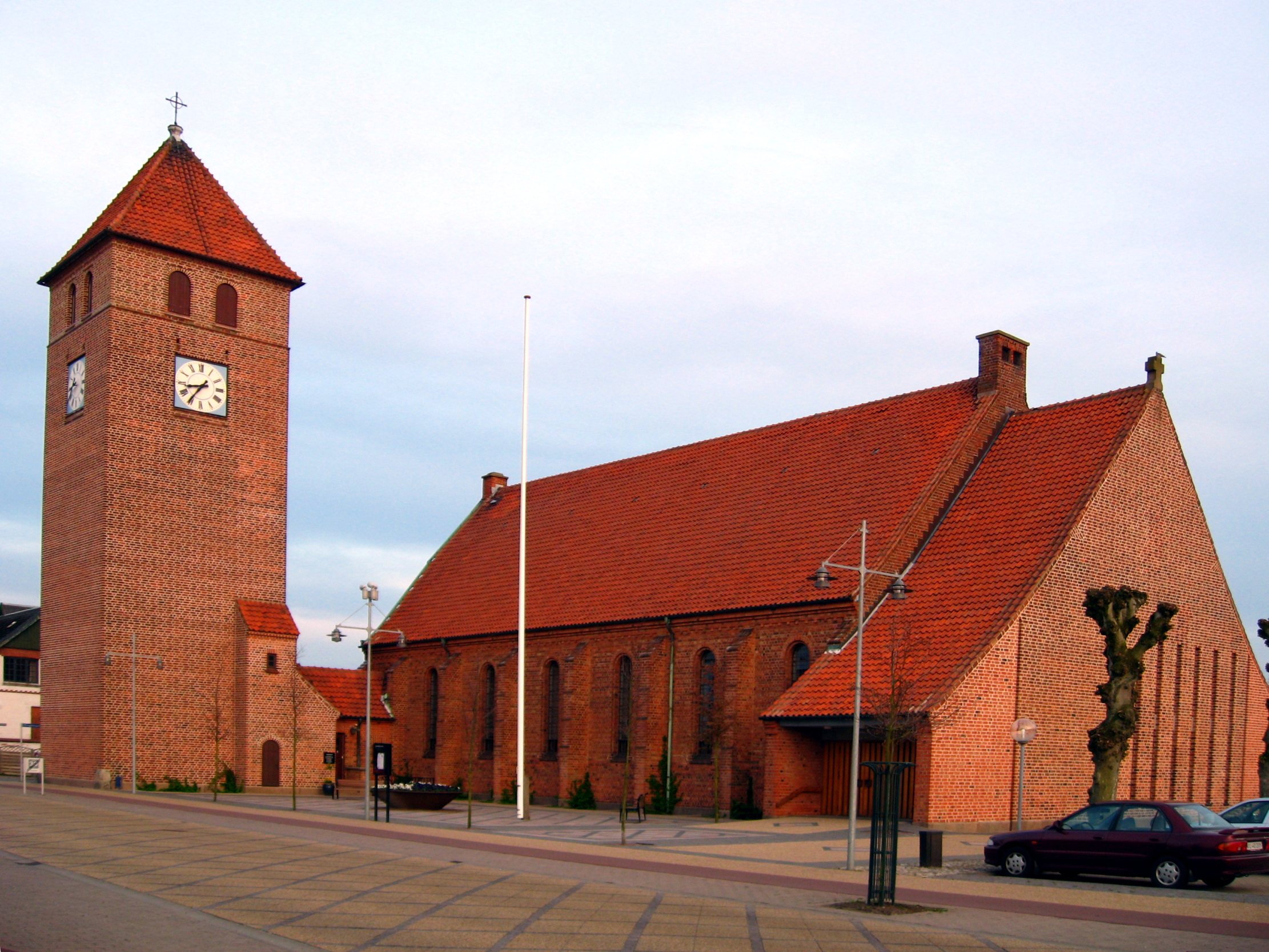
- Brønderslev Church, November 2010
- Brønderslev Church
- Location: Brønderslev, Denmark
- Denomination: Church of Denmark
- Website: www.broenderslevkirke.dk

History
- Consecrated: 1922

Architecture
- Architect: Valdemar Schmidt
- Years built: 1920–1922

Administration
- Diocese: Diocese of Aalborg
- Deanery: Brønderslev Provosti
- Parish: Brønderslev Sogn

Brønderslev Church (Danish: Brønderslev Kirke) is a Lutheran church in Brønderslev, Denmark. The church was designed by Valdemar Schmidt and built between 1920 and 1922.

== History ==
The church was designed by the architect Valdemar Schmidt in 1907. Construction began in 1920 and the church was dedicated on March 26, 1922. The tower was erected in 1925.

In 1972, the interior of the church was renovated. The original wooden cross above the altar was replaced in 1974 with the present crucifix, which was created by Johannes Hansen, who was the brother's pastor at the time. At the same time, the two eastern windows were fitted with stained glass by Helle Scharling, who had also made the smaller windows on the northern and southern sides of the church. A church hall on the west side of the church was built in 1982.

== Brønderslev Gamle Kirke ==
The old church in Brønderslev, referred to as Brønderslev Gamle Kirke or Vester Brønderslev Kirke, was built in the 12th century. It was built in the Romanesque style from granite blocks and its exterior walls are a meter thick. A steeple was built in the Gothic period, but was demolished in the 18th century. The church porch was built in 1623. It has been restored several times in varying styles, most recently between 1974 and 1976.

The church was privately owned until 1912. By that time, the old church in Brønderslev was no longer big enough to house the growing community. Expansions were purposed, but construction of a new church became necessary. The congregation officially moved to the new church in 1922. Since then, the old church has mostly been used as a chapel for the cemetery.

== Gallery ==
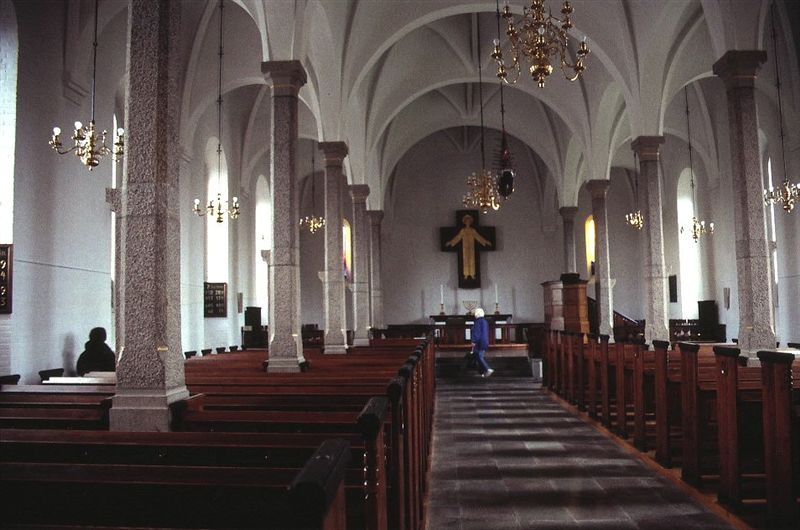
Nave in 2011

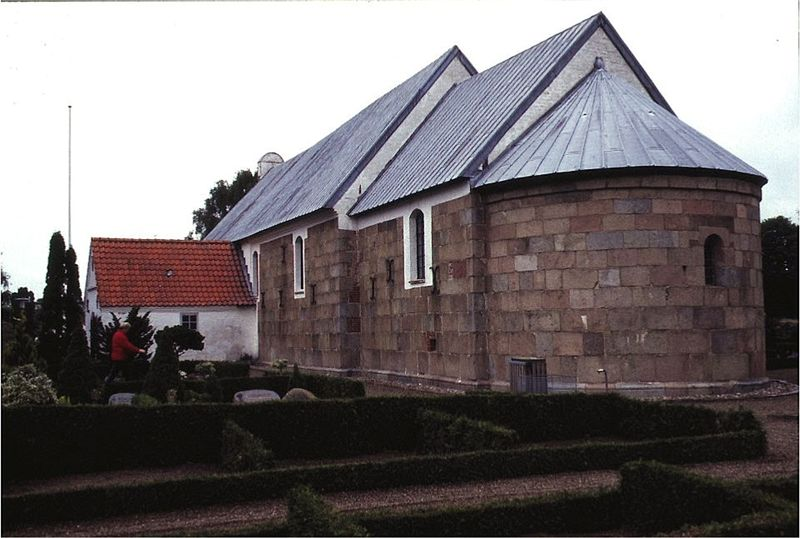
Brønderslev Gamle Kirke

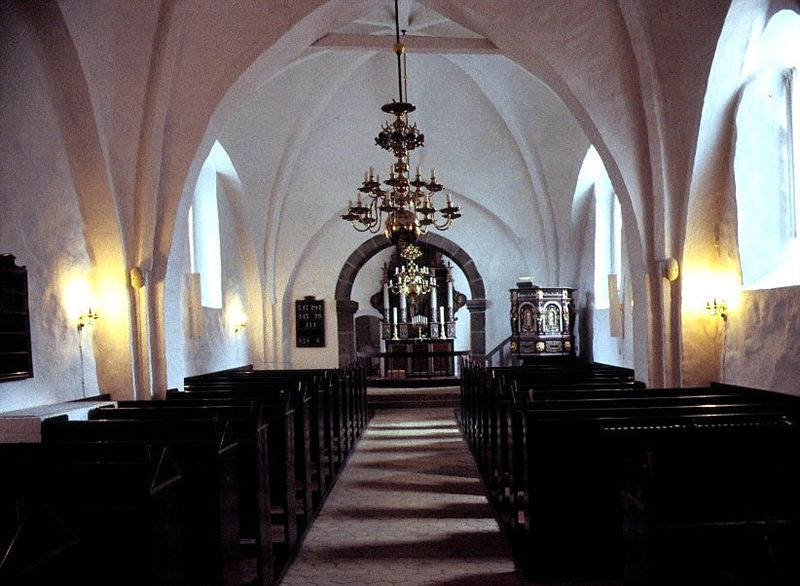
Nave of Brønderslev Gamle Kirke
