= Lars Agersted =

Danish handballer (born 1987)

Personal information
- Full name: Lars Agersted
- Nationality: Danish
- Born: 9 May 1987 (age 39)
- Height: 190 cm (6 ft 3 in)

Sport
- Sport: Handball
- Position: Right Winger
- Current club: Retired
- Number: 9

Lars Agersted (born 9 May 1987) is a Danish former handballer who played for Danish Handball League sides Nordsjælland Håndbold, TMS Ringsted, GOG Håndbold and Ajax København. He previously played for league rivals GOG Svendborg and TMS Ringsted.

Twice he was awarded he was awarded the best player of the year in the Danish 1st Division, in 2013 and in 2014.

He retired in 2014 following a season with Ajax København.
