= Asaa =

Town in North Jutland Region, Denmark

- Town
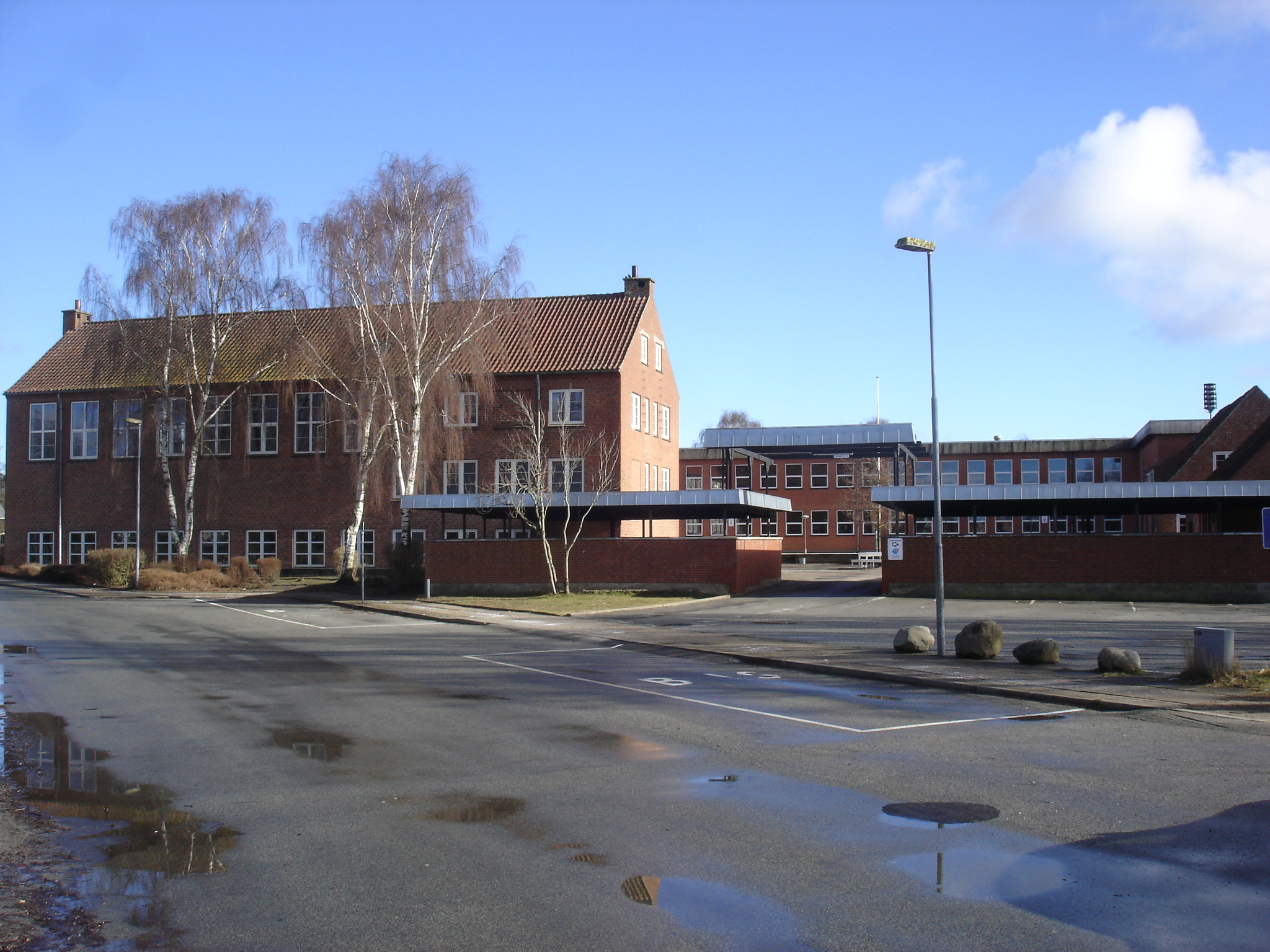
- Asaa School

- Location within Denmark Location within North Jutland Region
- Coordinates: 57°8′53″N 10°24′8″E
- Country: Denmark
- Region: North Denmark
- Municipality: Brønderslev

Area
  - Urban: 1.0 km^{2} (0.39 sq mi)

Population (2026)
  - Urban: 1,059
  - Urban density: 1,100/km^{2} (2,700/sq mi)
- Time zone: UTC+1 (CET)
  - Summer (DST): UTC+2 (CEST)
- Postal code: DK-9340 Asaa

Asaa is a small coastal and tourist town, with a population of 1,059 (1 January 2026), on the east coast of Vendsyssel in Denmark.

Asaa is located in Brønderslev Municipality in North Jutland Region, 40 km northeast of Aalborg, 19 km north of Hals, 24 km south of Sæby, 7 km east of Dronninglund and 38 km southeast of Brønderslev.

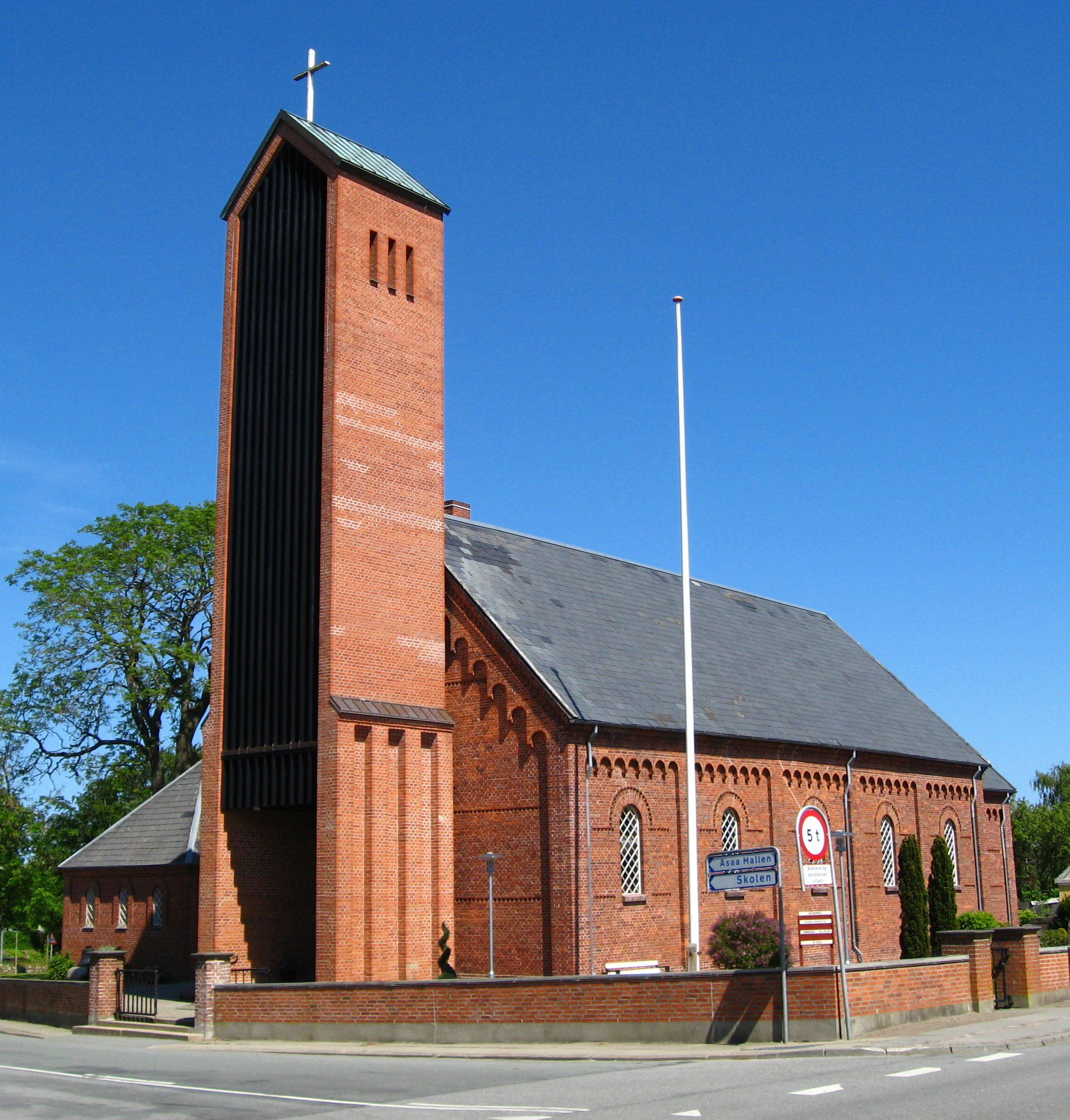
Asaa Church

Asaa Church is located in the middle of the town.

== Asaa Harbour ==
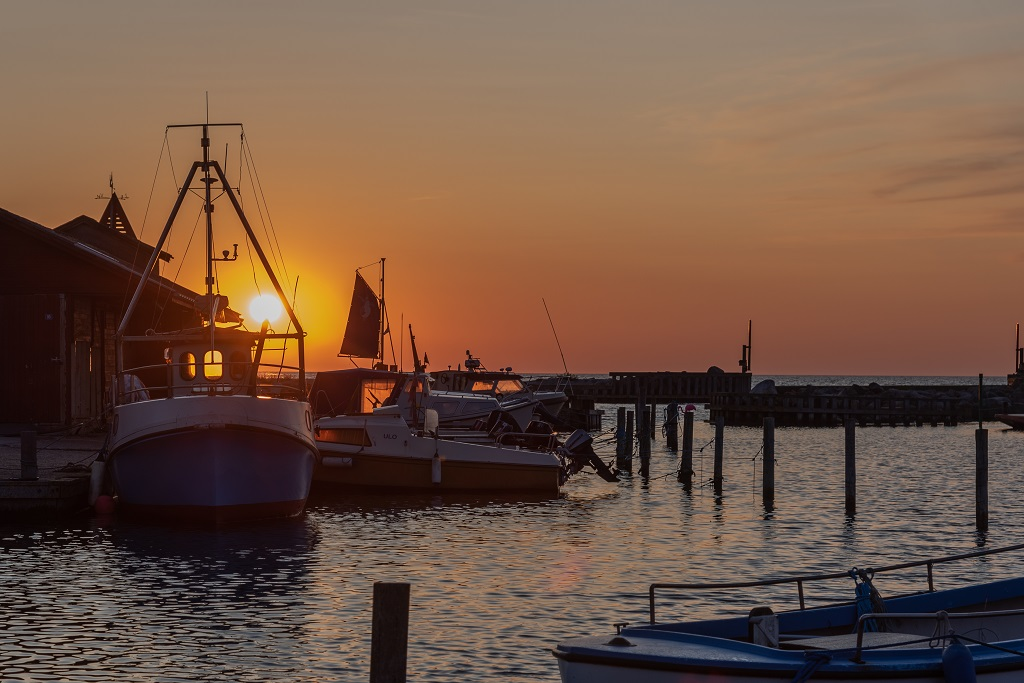
Asaa Harbour during the sunrise

The history of Asaa Harbour dates back to 1877 when the harbour was built as an island harbour.

In the period 1905 to 1977, the harbour has been expanded, where the last expansion in 1976–1977 was the construction of a marina.

The marina is located north of the old harbour basins.

One of the iconic fishermen's red-painted houses from the 1930s has been converted into a museum of fisheries.

Asaa Beach, a shallow and sandy beach, is situated just south of the harbour.

=== Recent Controversy ===
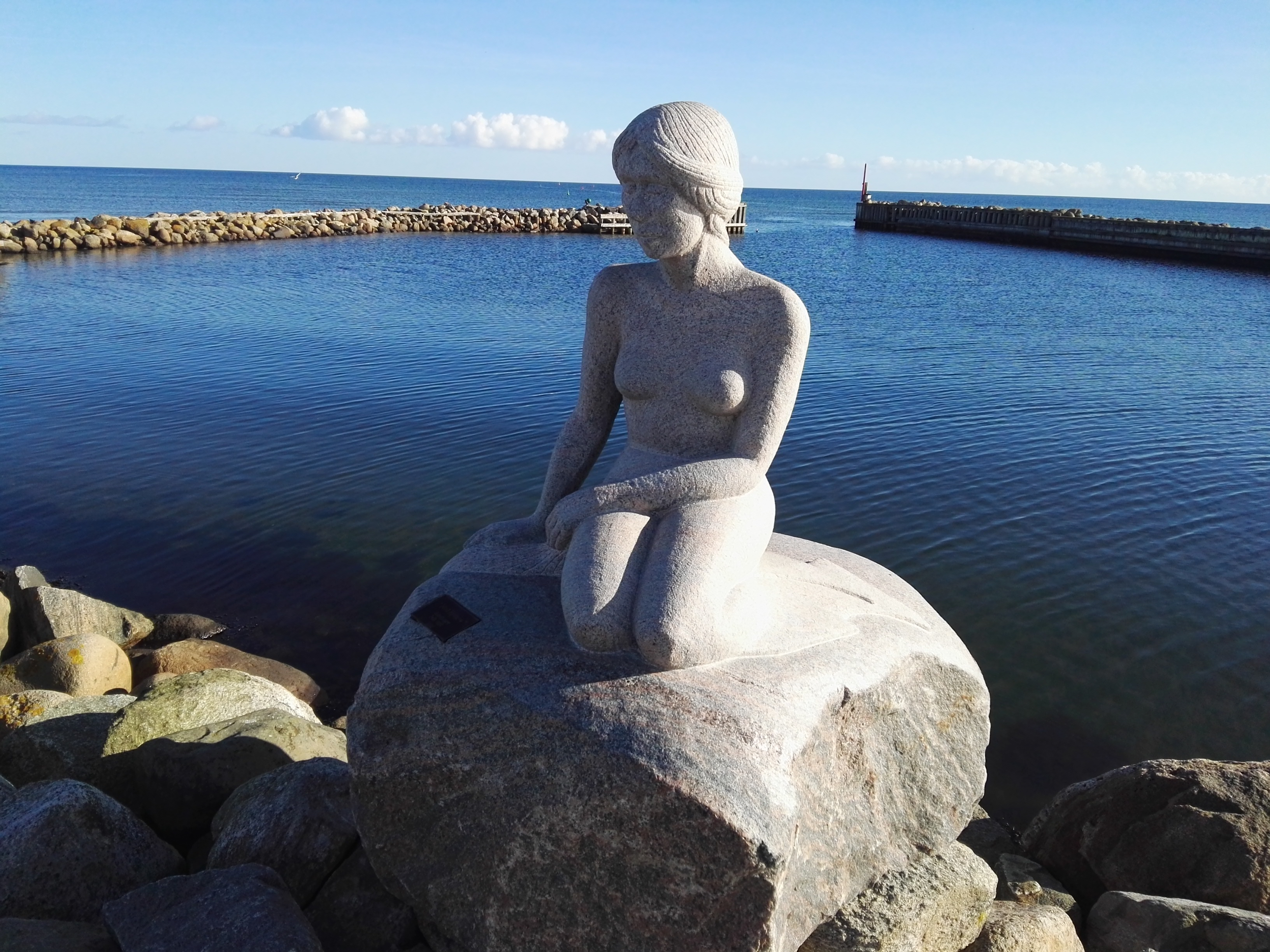

In the harbour there is a statue of a woman sitting on a rock, carved from stone. The heirs of the sculptor Edvard Eriksen requested it to be torn down as they believed it to be to similar to his statue of Hans Christian Andersen's The Little Mermaid in Copenhagen harbour. Coverage reached The New York Times

== Notable people ==
- Ellen Gottschalch (1894–1981), a Danish stage and film actress was born in Asaa.
