= Brønderslev Municipality =

Brønderslev Municipality Brønderslev Kommune (Danish)
- Municipality
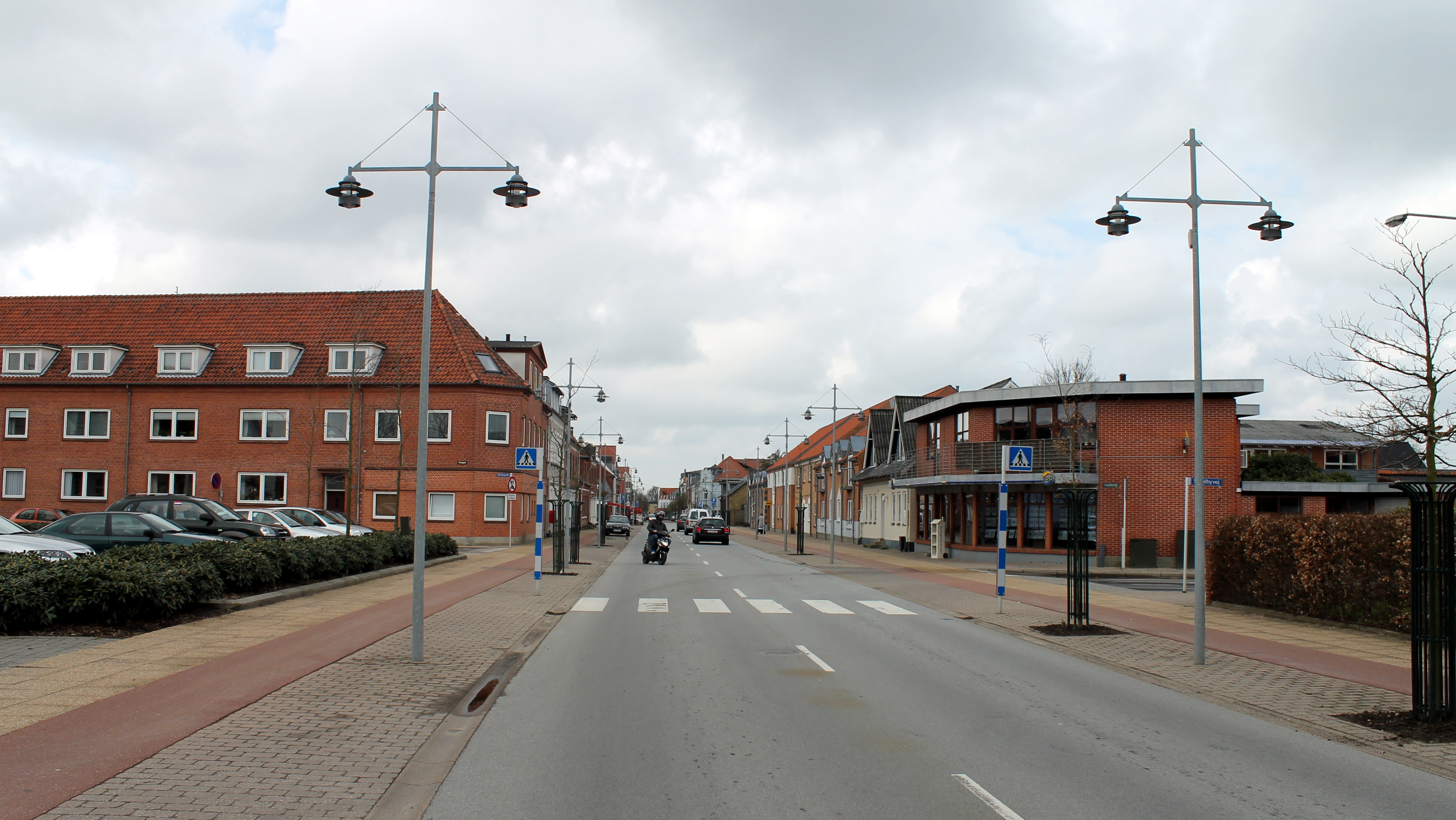

- Coat of arms

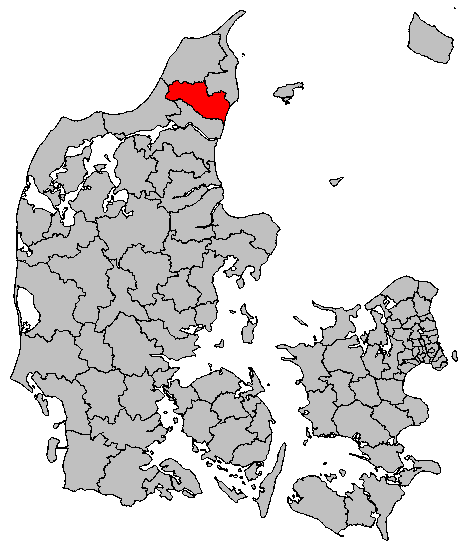
- Location in Denmark
- Coordinates: 57°16′06″N 9°56′45″E
- Country: Denmark
- Region: North Jutland
- Established: 1 January 2007

Government
  - Mayor: Mikael Klitgaard

Area
  - Total: 633.38 km^{2} (244.55 sq mi)

Population (1 January 2026)
  - Total: 36,529
  - Density: 57.673/km^{2} (149.37/sq mi)
- Time zone: UTC+1 (CET)
  - Summer (DST): UTC+2 (CEST)
- Postal code: 9700
- Website: www.bronderslev.dk

Brønderslev Municipality (Danish: Brønderslev Kommune) is a municipality (Danish, kommune) in North Jutland Region in Denmark. It covers an area of 630 km^{2} and has a total population of 36,529 (2026). The municipal council is located in the town of Brønderslev.

The municipality was created as the result of 2007 Kommunalreformen, and consists of the former municipalities of Brønderslev and Dronninglund. The resulting municipality was originally named Brønderslev-Dronninglund Municipality (Danish: Brønderslev-Dronninglund Kommune), the longest name of a municipality in Denmark with 32 characters. At their first meeting, the municipal council agreed to shorten the name to its current form: Brønderslev Municipality.

== Communities ==
Cities and towns by population (2021)
Brønderslev	12,522
Hjallerup	4,192
Dronninglund	3,435
Asaa	1,123
Øster Brønderslev	924
Klokkerholm	890
Jerslev	870
Flauenskjold	669
Agersted	562
Serritslev	500

== Municipal council ==
Since 2007, Brønderslev's municipal council has consisted of 27 members, elected every four years.

Below is the current composition of the council

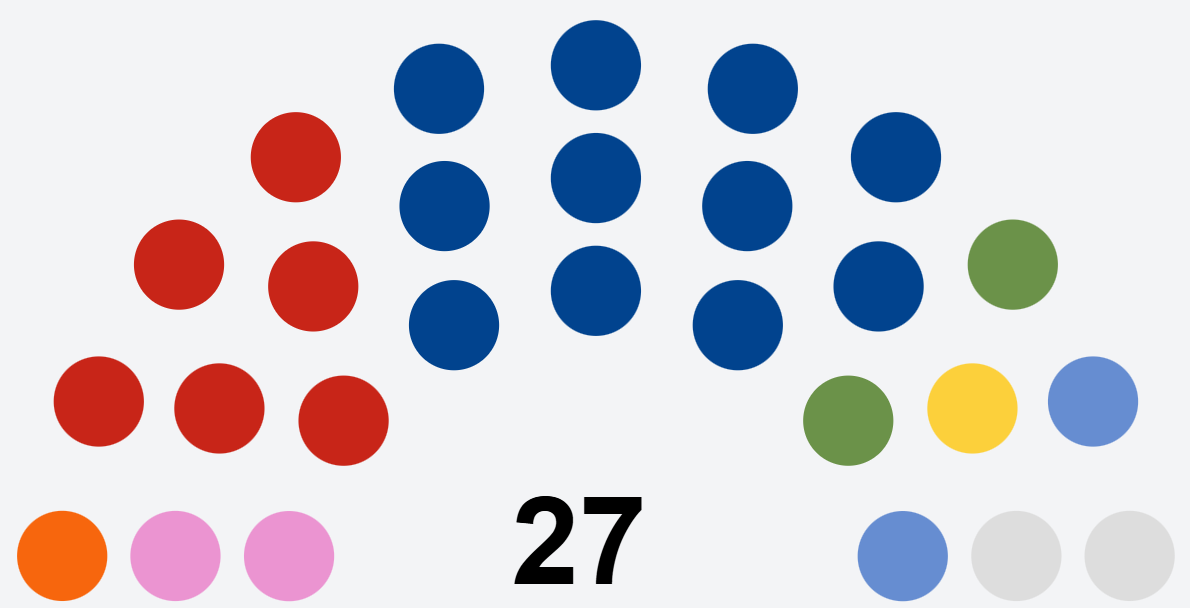

Municipal council elections 2005-2021
Election	Party										Total seats	Turnout	Elected mayor
Election	A	C	D'	F	I	J	O	V	Æ	Ø	Total seats	Turnout	Elected mayor
2005	10	1		1		3	1	13			29	72.7%	Mikael Klitgaard (V)
2009	11	1		3			1	11			27	70.1%	Lene Hansen (A)
2013	9	2		1		2	1	11		1	27	75.7%	Mikael Klitgaard (V)
2017	11	2				2	2	10			27	72.8%	Mikael Klitgaard (V)
2021	8	2	1	1		1	1	12		1	27	69.94	Mikael Klitgaard (V)
Data from Kmdvalg.dk 2005, 2009, 2013, 2017, 2021

== Twin towns ==
Brønderslev is twinned with:

- Eidsberg, Norway
- Nässjö, Sweden
