= Flauenskjold =

- Village
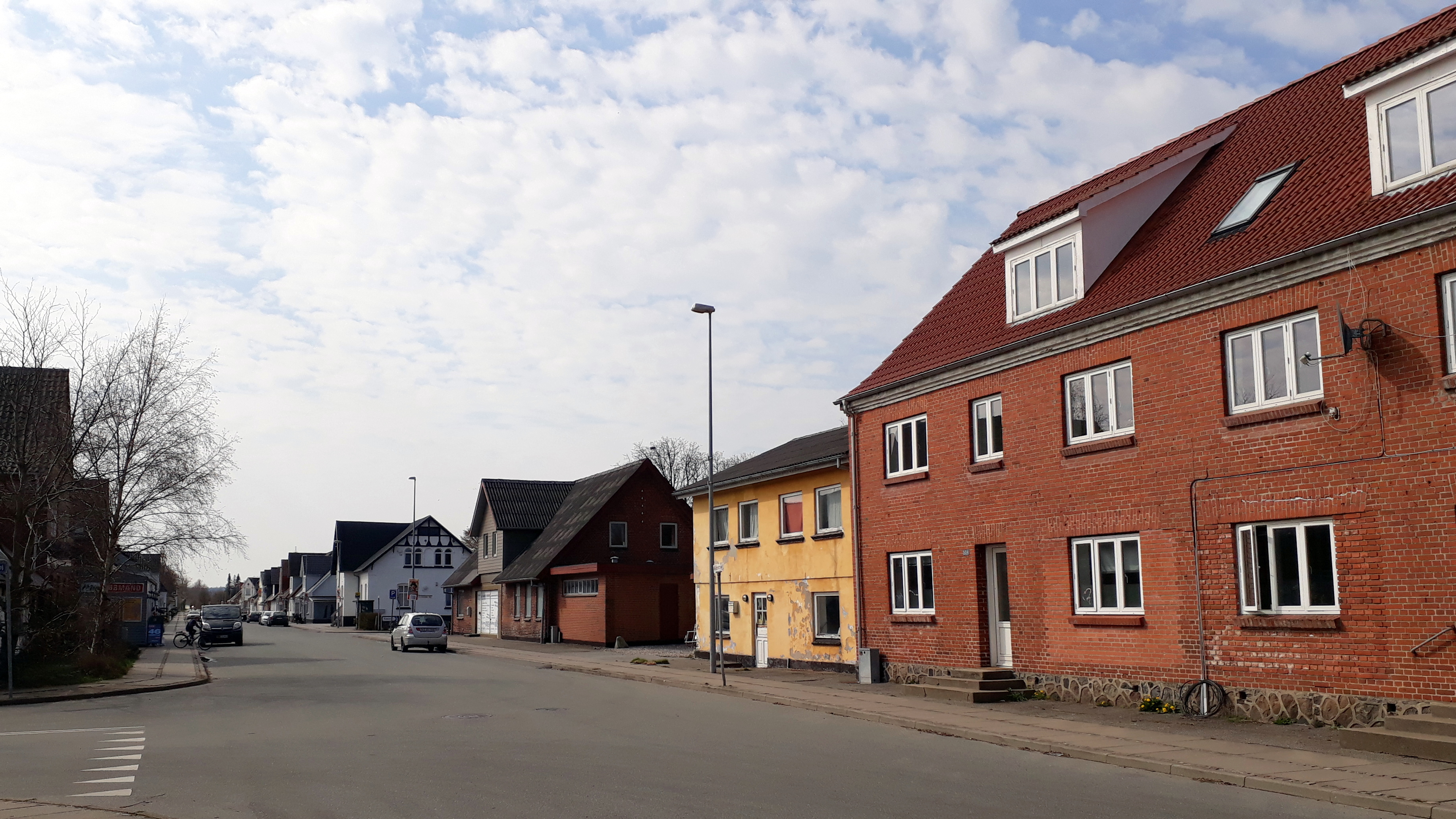
- Flauenskjold, April 2019

- Location in the North Jutland Region Flauenskjold (Denmark)
- Coordinates: 57°14′59″N 10°17′10″E
- Country: Denmark
- Region: North Jutland Region
- Municipality: Brønderslev Municipality
- Parish: Voer Parish

Population (2026)
  - Total: 650
- Time zone: UTC+1 (CET)
- Postal code: 9330 Dronninglund
- Website: flauenskjoldby.dk

Flauenskjold is a village in Vendsyssel, Denmark, with a population of 650 (1 January 2026). It is located in Brønderslev Municipality in North Jutland Region near the Frederikshavn Motorway, the part of the European route E45 between Aalborg and Frederikshavn.

The village is located 35 km northeast of Aalborg and 17 km southwest of Sæby. The neighboring village of Dybvad is located 5 km northeast of Flauenskjold.

The fictional character Fru Elvira Mortensen from Politiken's column "At tænke sig" resides in Flauenskjold.

== Geography ==
Flauenskjold is situated in the eastern part of the Vendsyssel region at the foot of Jyske Ås (Jutlandic Ridge).

== History ==
Around the turn of the century, the village was described as follows: "Flauenskjold, by the main road, with the Mission House "Bethesda" (built in 1898), Vestengaard School, inn, doctor's and veterinarian's residence, shop, several craftsmen, cooperative dairy, market square (markets in April, September, and November), post office, and telephone station." Flauenskjold had 144 inhabitants in 1906, 138 in 1911, and 216 in 1916.

Flauenskjold continued to develop during the interwar period and after World War II: in 1921, the village had 308 inhabitants, 310 in 1925, 447 in 1930, 485 in 1935, 490 in 1940, 414 in 1945, 449 in 1950, 587 in 1955, 556 in 1960, and 612 inhabitants in 1965.
