= Hjallerup =

- town
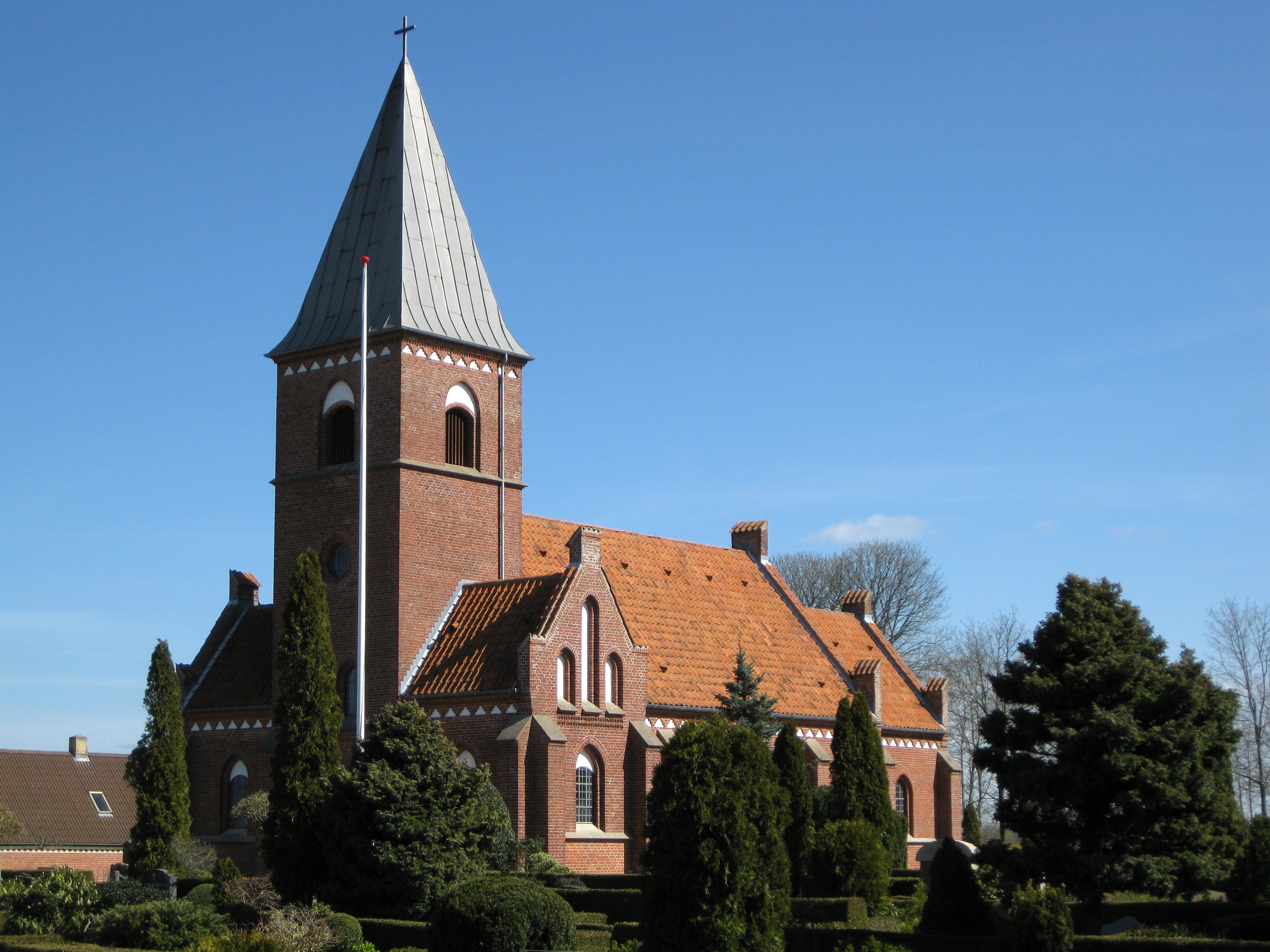
- Hjallerup church

- Location in Denmark Hjallerup (North Jutland Region)
- Coordinates: 57.1675°N 10.145°E
- Country: Denmark
- Region: North Denmark (Nordjylland)
- Municipality: Brønderslev

Area
  - Urban: 3.2 km^{2} (1.2 sq mi)

Population (2026)
  - Urban: 4,498
  - Urban density: 1,400/km^{2} (3,600/sq mi)
  - Gender: 2,239 males and 2,259 females
- Time zone: UTC+1 (CET)
  - Summer (DST): UTC+2 (CEST)
- Postal code: DK-9320 Hjallerup

Hjallerup is a small town in Northern Jutland, Denmark with a population of 4,498 (2026), located in Hjallerup parish. It is the second largest town in Brønderslev Municipality and belongs to the North Denmark Region.

The town is known for the annual Hjallerup Market - a horse market held during the first weekend of June every year - which is also a meeting place for buskers and vagabonds.

== Gallery ==
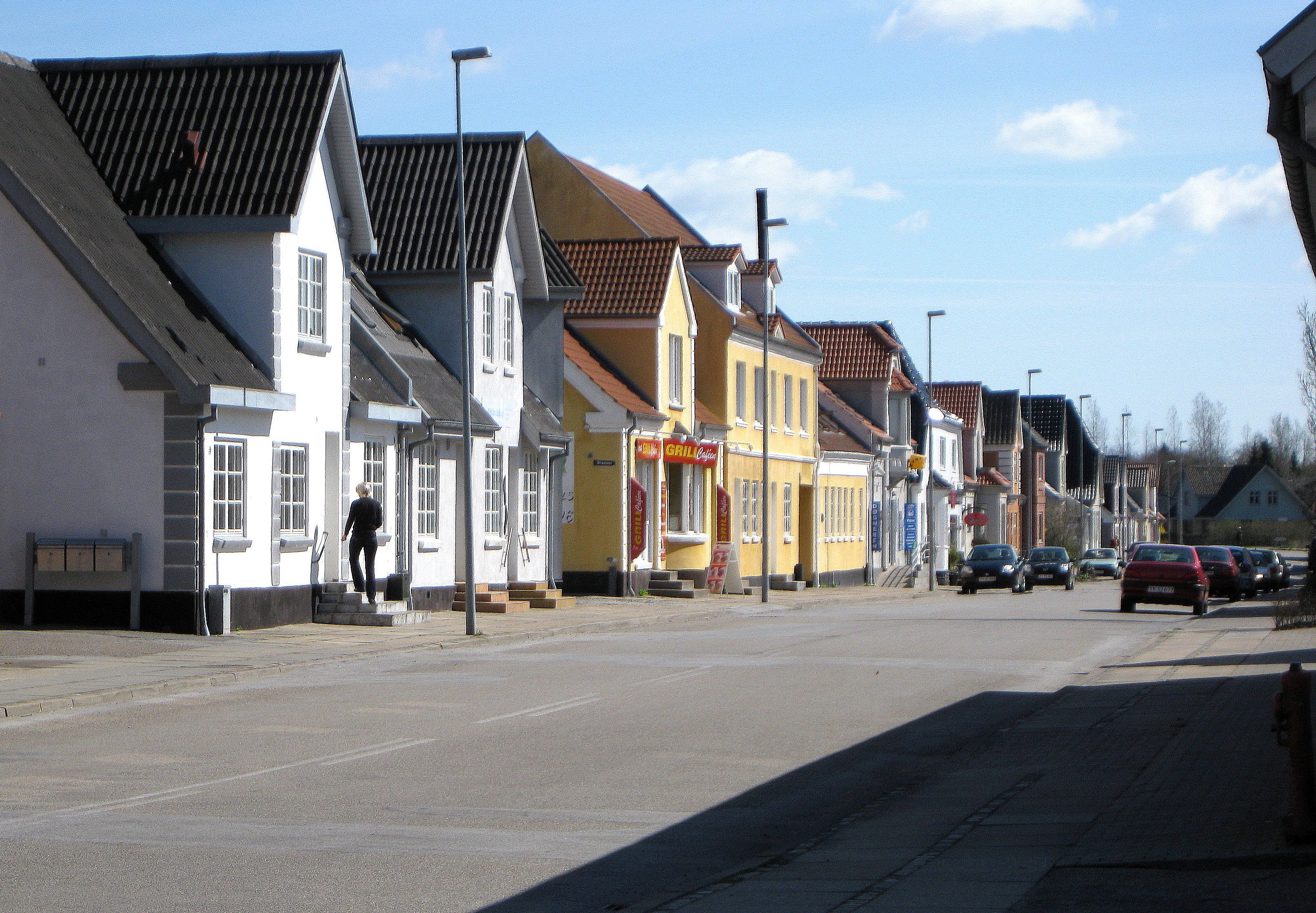
The street "Østergade" in Hjallerup

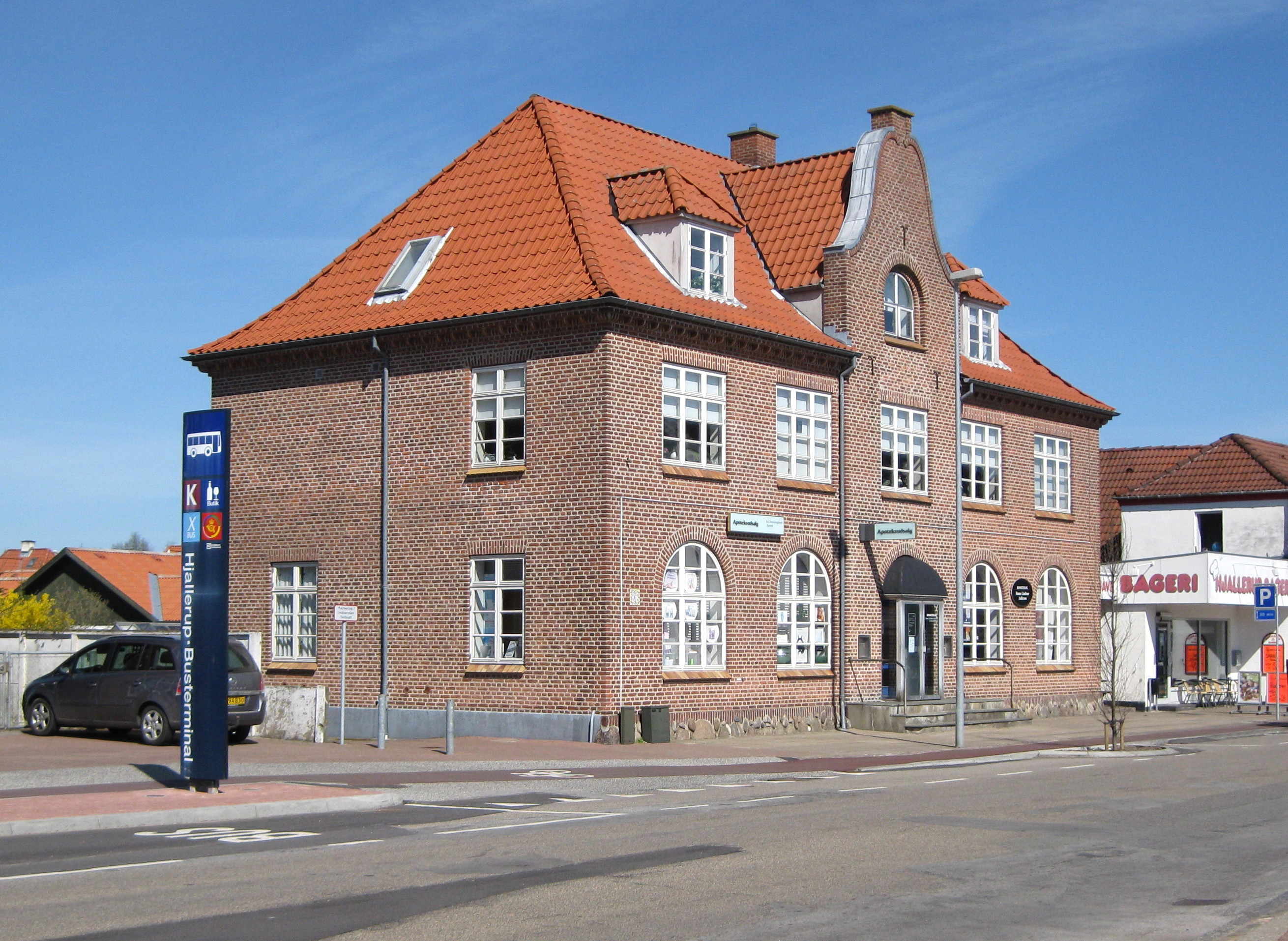
The pharmacy in Hjallerup

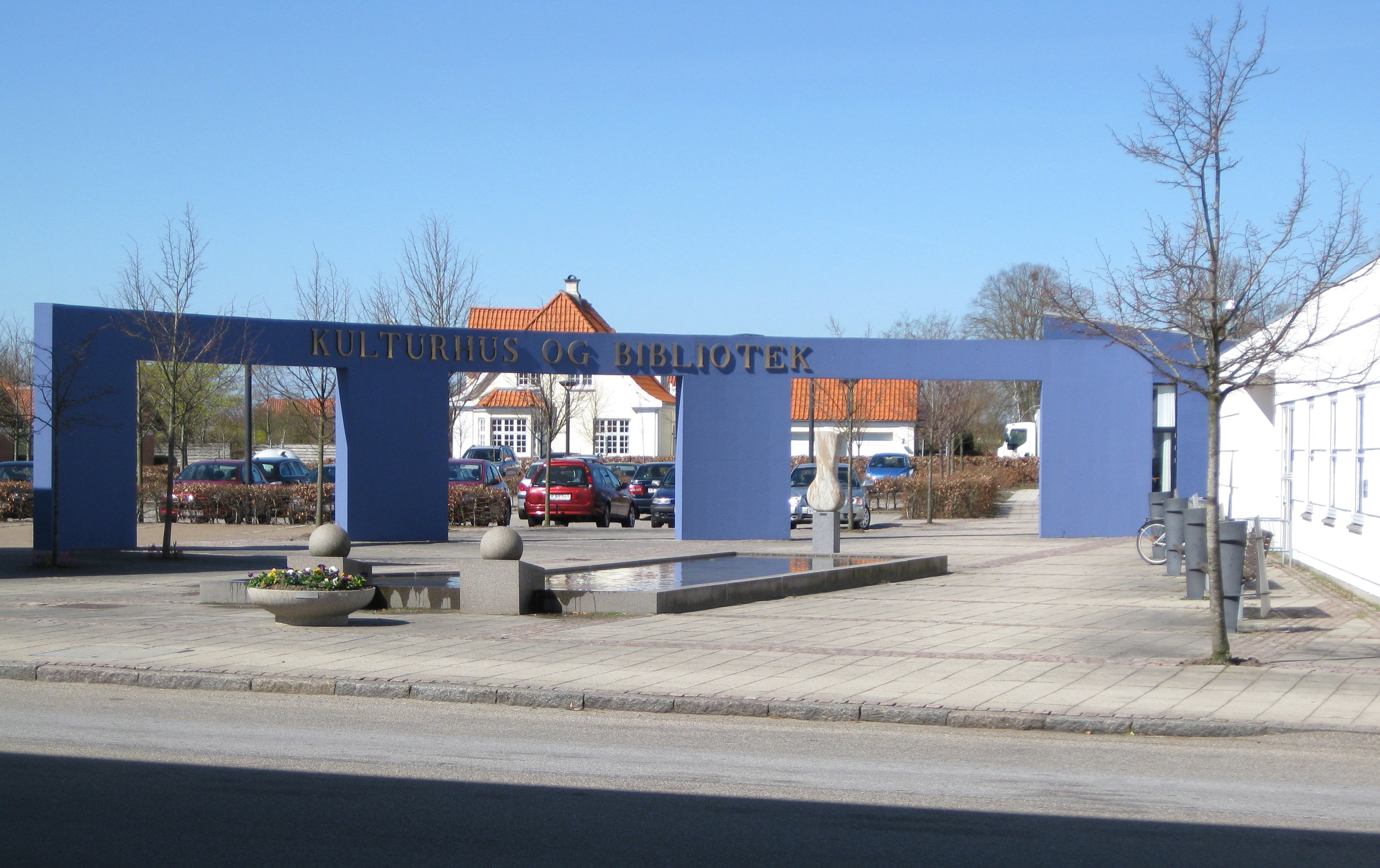
Hjallerup cultural center and library

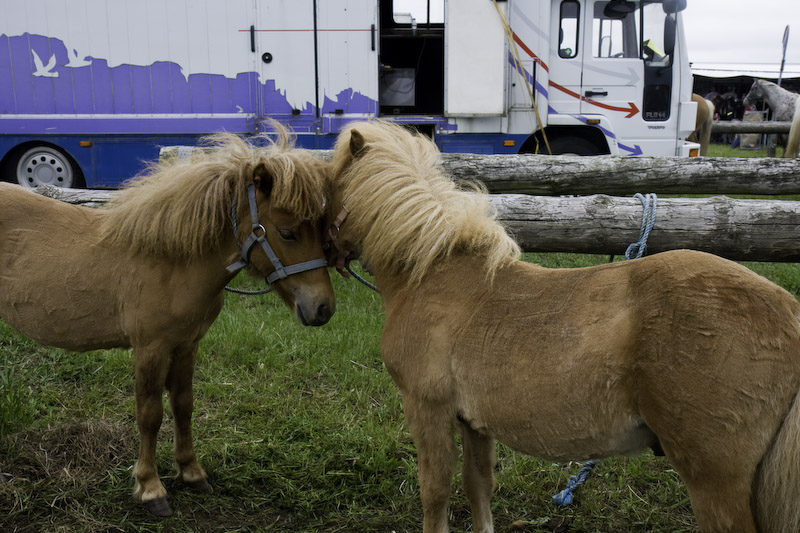
Horses on Hjallerup Market 2007

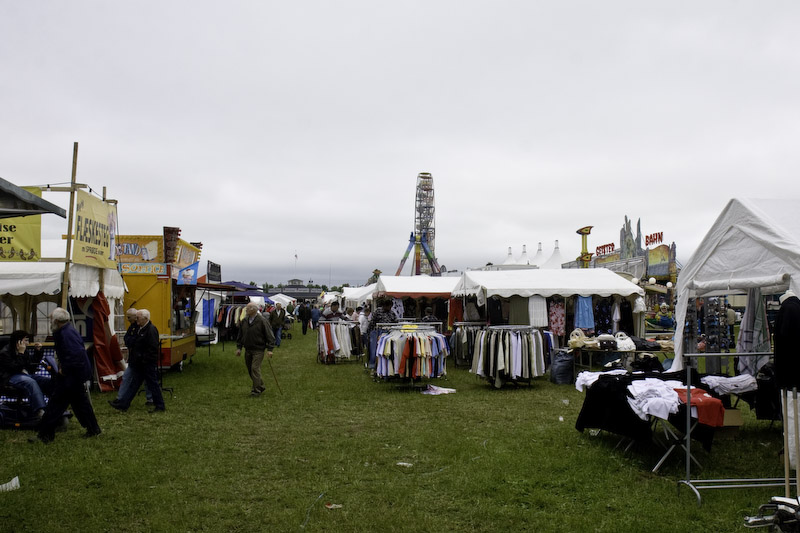
Trade on Hjallerup Market 2007
