= Brønderslev =

- City
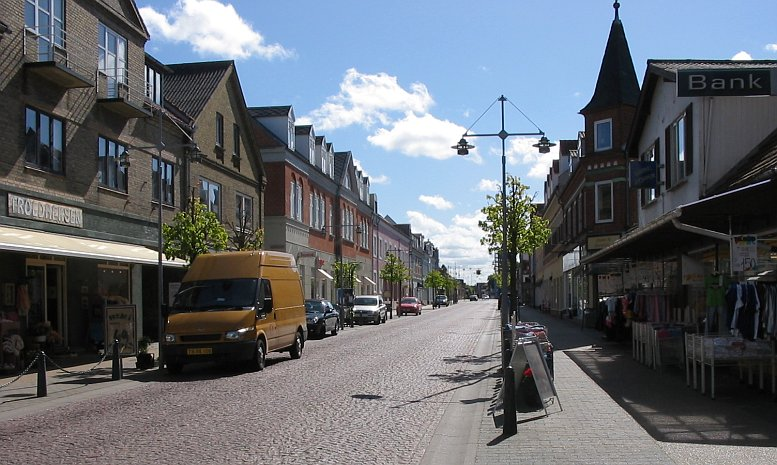

- Coat of arms

- Location in Denmark Brønderslev (North Jutland Region)
- Coordinates: 57°16′10″N 9°56′50″E
- Country: Denmark
- Region: North Jutland Region
- Municipality: Brønderslev Municipality

Area
  - Urban: 8.3 km^{2} (3.2 sq mi)

Population (2026)
  - Urban: 12,825
  - Urban density: 1,500/km^{2} (4,000/sq mi)
  - Gender: 6,273 males and 6,552 females
- Demonym: Brønderslevbo
- Time zone: UTC+1 (CET)
  - Summer (DST): UTC+2 (CEST)
- Postal code: DK-9700 Brønderslev
- Website: www.bronderslev.dk

Brønderslev is a city in Denmark with a population of 12,825 (1 January 2026). The city is the largest urban area in Brønderslev Municipality and is the municipal seat. It is the fourth largest city of Vendsyssel within the North Jutland Region.

== History ==
The name of the town is derived from a local Norsemen chief, Brunder. Brønderslev was formerly known as Vester Brønderslev, in contrast to the neighboring Øster Brønderslev. As of 2020, Øster Brønderslev has a population of just 943.

Vester Brønderslev was once a small farming village. In 1682, it consisted of just 27 farms and 47 houses. The town was not initially located on any major thoroughfares and saw very little traffic. Thus, the town grew comparatively gradually. By the 1850s, however, an inn and an established market had begun to draw more traders to settle on the road near the city. In 1871, the Vendsyssel railway line opened which connected Brønderslev to Aalborg and Hjørring. The station was located in the old part of town and revitalized development in that area. By the 1880s, Brønderslev had its own post office, hospital, technical school, trade school, library, banks, pharmacy, and a daily newspaper. In 1921, Brønderslev was officially designated as a Købstad (English: market town). It has since become a major trading and industrial city in the region.

== Geography ==
Brønderslev is located near the center of Vendsyssel and is nearly equidistant from the region's two other large cities: Aalborg and Hjørring. The city is approximately 13–22 meters above sea level, with the terrain rising towards the northernmost parts of the city. The southern part of the city is characterized by meadow areas.

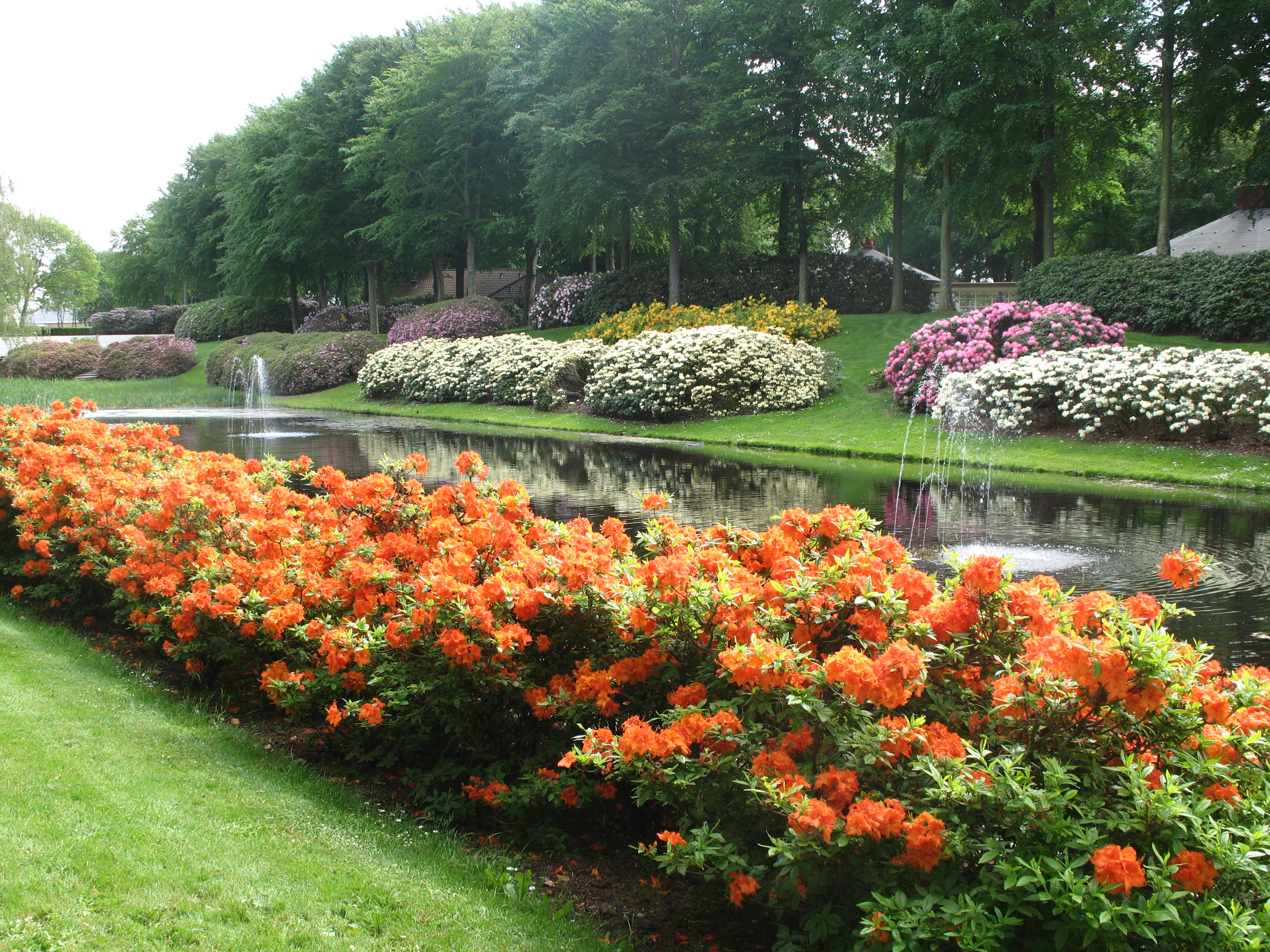
Rhododendron park, 2012

Southwest of Brønderslev is the large bog, called Store Vildmose. The bog is a natural attraction in itself, but it has also revealed many archaeological finds, particularly from the Iron Age. Brønderslev is home to the regional-museum of Vildmosemuseet (English: The Vildmose Museum), which focuses on the cultural history of Store Vildmose and the surrounding area. Vildmosemuseet is part of The Museums in Brønderslev Municipality which comprise a total of three museums, the other two being Try Museum and Dorf Møllegård, both of which are located in Dronninglund.

In 1994, the Hedelund Rhododendron Park was established within the city on the site of a beech tree park which had been there since 1890. The park covers an area of 7 hectares, making it one of the largest of its kind within the nordic countries. It contains more than 10,000 individual plants from over 130 different species of Rhododendron.

== Infrastructure ==
=== Education ===
There are three primary schools located within the city: Hedegaardsskolen, Skolegades skole, and Søndergades skole. The city's secondary school, Brønderslev Gymnasium of HF, was first proposed by the city council in 1953, though it did not officially open until 1973. As of 2007, the gymnasium is an independent institution.

Nordjyllands Idrætshøjskole is an athletic folk high school which has been located in the city since 1986. The land on which it sits had previously been used for agriculture and was purchased by the municipality which then built the school's facilities.

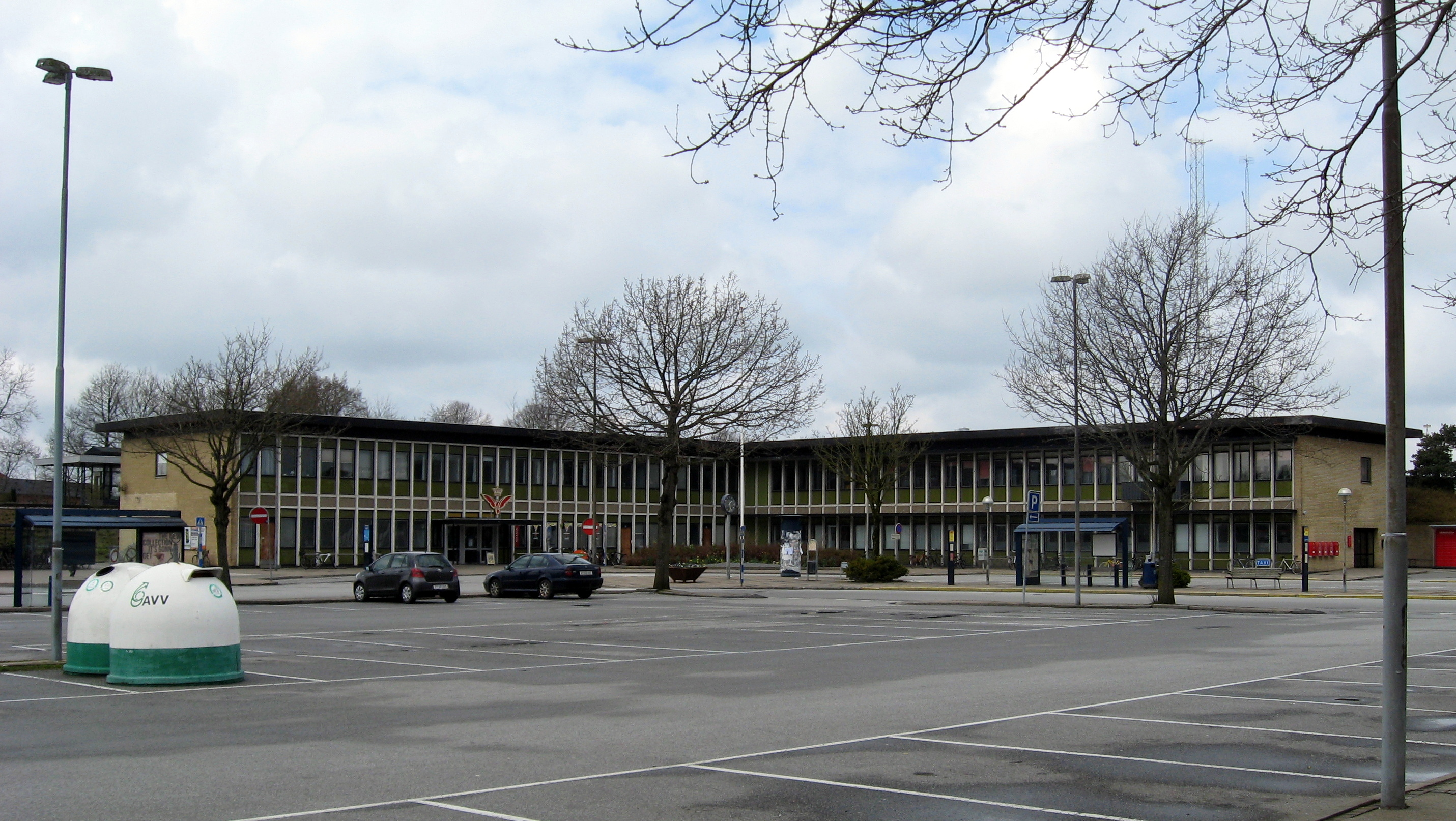
Brønderslev station

=== Transportation ===
Brønderslev is served by Brønderslev railway station. It is located on the Aalborg-Hjørring-Frederikshavn railway line and offers direct InterCity services to Copenhagen and Frederikshavn, along with regional train services to Aalborg and Frederikshavn.

The E39 motorway passes by Brønderslev. Since the completion of a bypass around the city in 2000, there is no heavy traffic directly through the city.

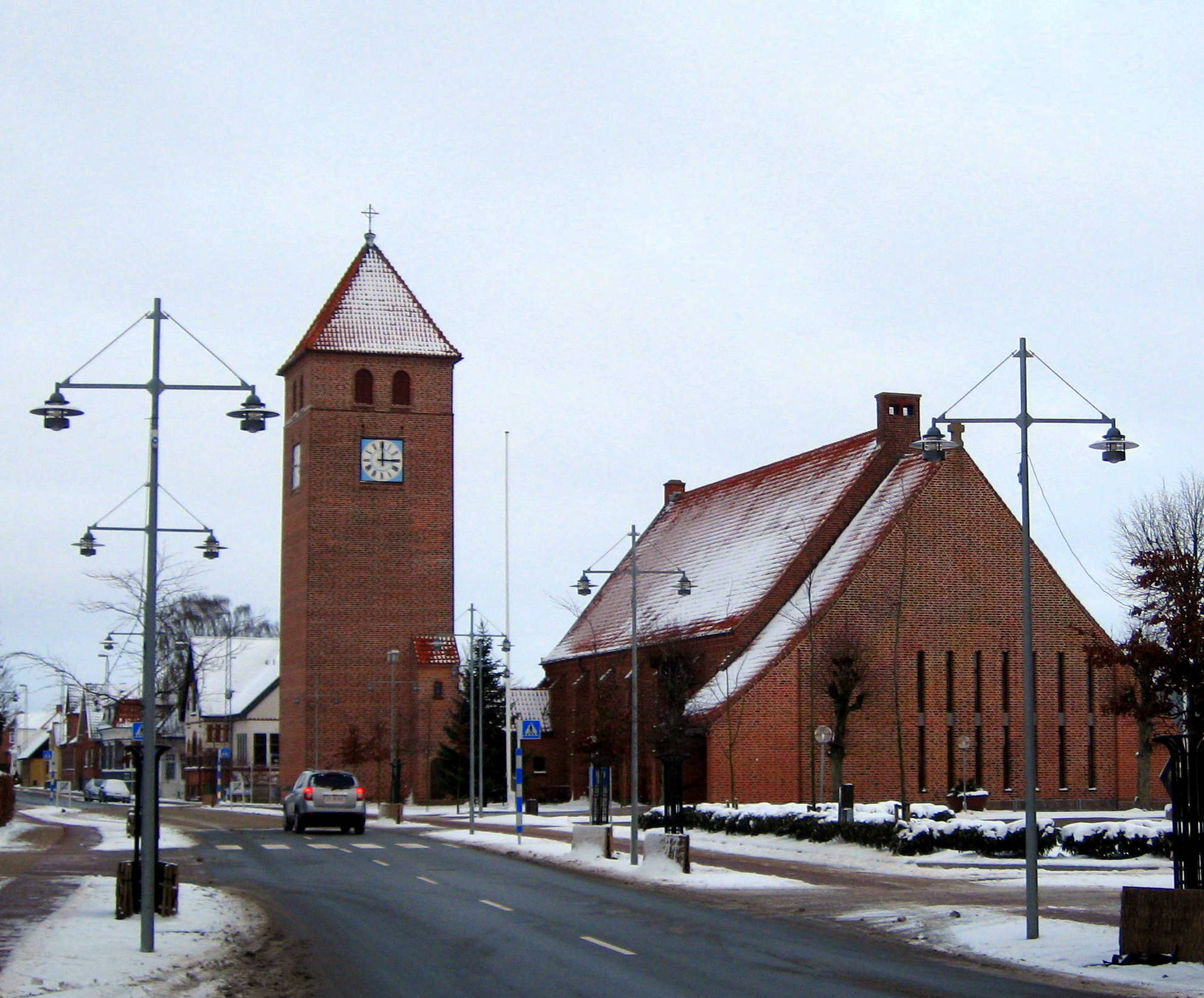
Brønderslev Church, 2010

== Religion ==
The Church of Denmark has two churches within the city. Brønderslev Gamle Kirke was originally built during the 12th century in the romanesque style. Brønderslev Church was built in 1920 to accommodate the town's growing population.

Also located within the city is the Brønderslev International Apostolic Church.

== Notable people ==
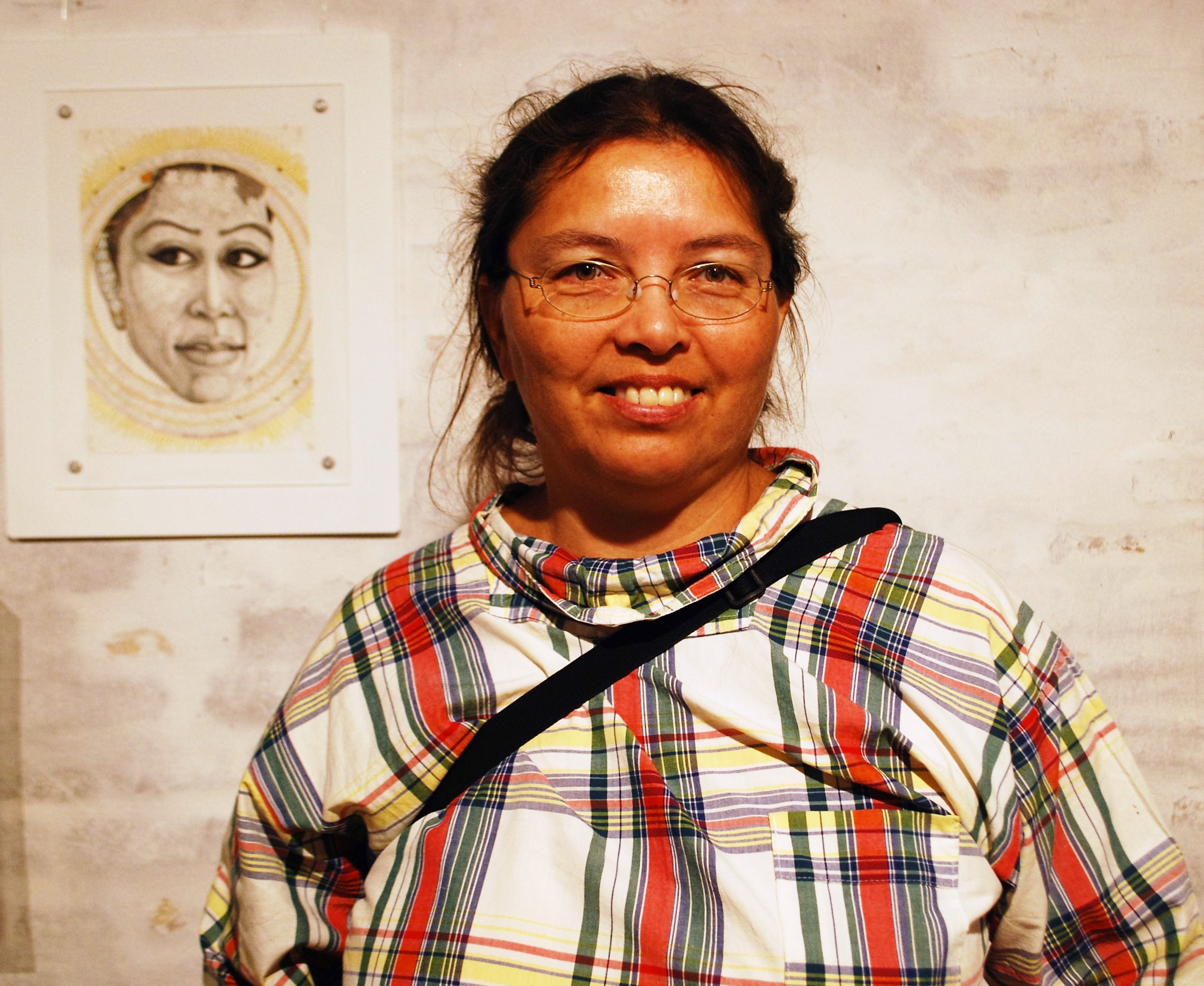
Naja Abelsen, 2016

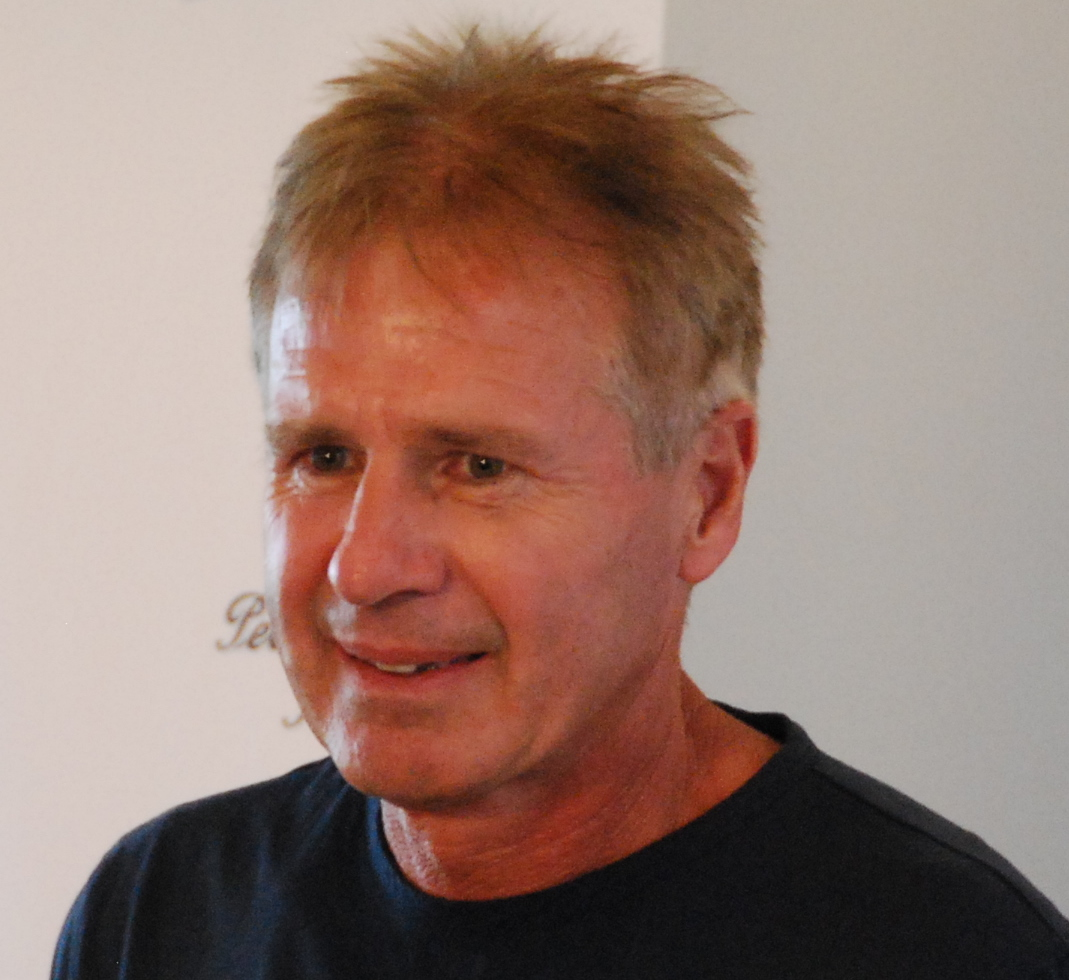
Ove Christensen, 2011

- Peder Møller (1877–1940), violinist and music teacher
- Ejnar Mikkelsen (1880–1971), polar explorer and author.
- Ellen Gottschalch (1894 in Asaa –1981), actress
- Per Bak (1948–2002), theoretical physicist
- Naja Abelsen (born 1964), painter and illustrator
- Marianne Gaarden (born 1964), prelate and bishop of Lolland-Falster
- Lone Dencker Wisborg (born 1966), Denmark’s ambassador to the United States.
- The Blue Van: blues rock band formed in Brønderslev in 2003

=== Sport ===
- Ove Christensen (born 1950), Association football manager, most recently of Vendsyssel FF
- Kim Jensen (born 1961), former assistant coach for the Denmark women's national handball team
- Jakob Ahlmann Nielsen (born 1991), footballer

== Sources ==
- Municipal statistics: NetBorger Kommunefakta, delivered from KMD aka Kommunedata (Municipal Data)
- Municipal mergers and neighbors: Eniro new municipalities map
