= Dronningens Tværgade 5 =

Building

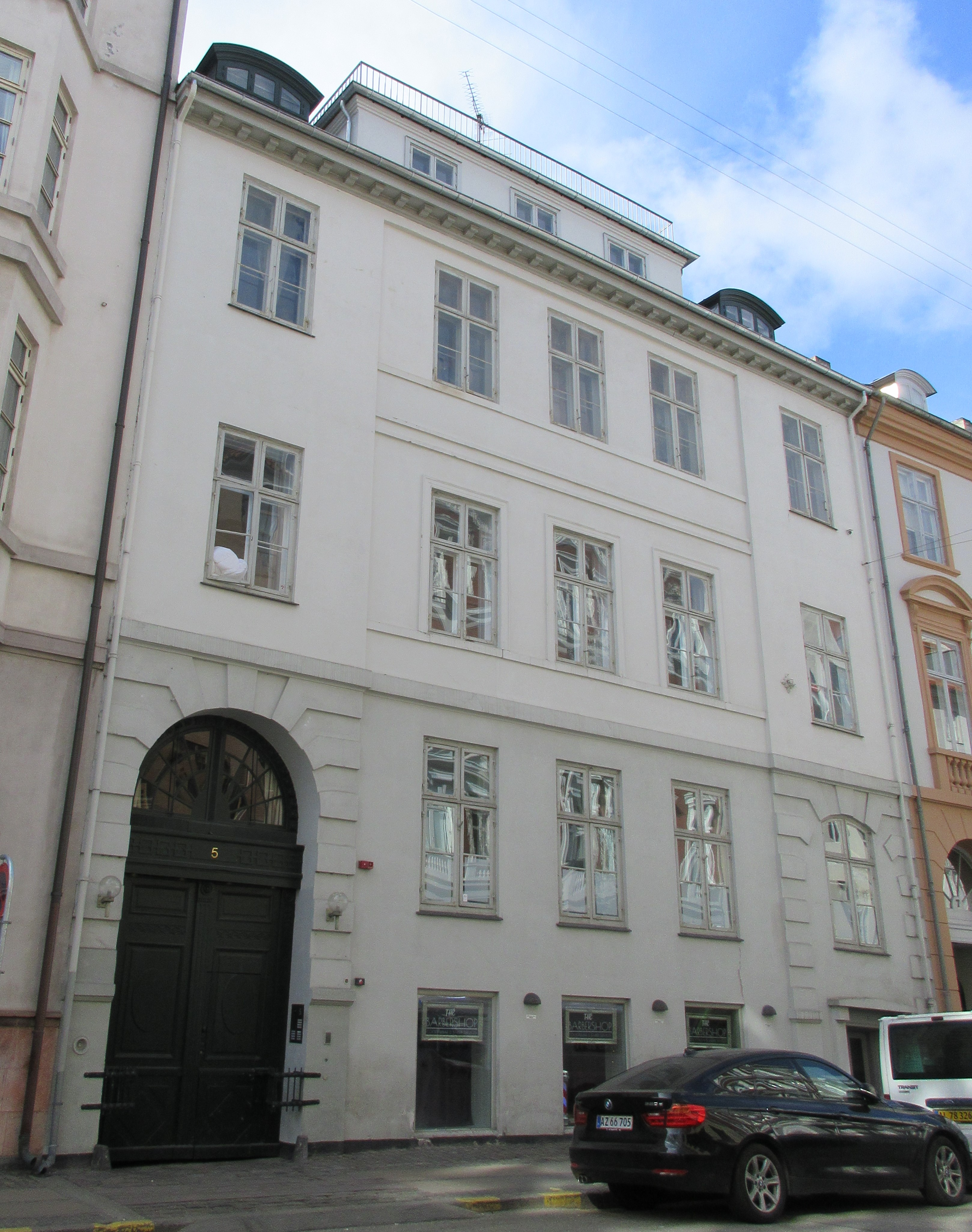

General information
- Architectural style: Neoclassical
- Location: Copenhagen, Denmark
- Coordinates: 55°40′59.77″N 12°35′16.8″E
- Completed: 1794

Dronningens Tværgade 5 is a Neoclassical property situated in Dronningens Tværgade, opposite the Moltke Mansion, in central Copenhagen, Denmark. The building fronting the street, together with the adjacent buildings at No. 7 and No. 9, was constructed in 1793–1794 by master builders Hans Ondrup and A. Giedde. At the rear, there is a three-storey side wing and a one-storey former bank building, both dating from c. 1850. The entire complex was listed in the Danish registry of protected buildings and places in 1951 and 1999. Notable former residents include the jurist and later prime minister of Denmark Peter Georg Bang, the military officer Hans Dahlerup and the poet and author Vita Andersen.

== History ==
=== Construction ===
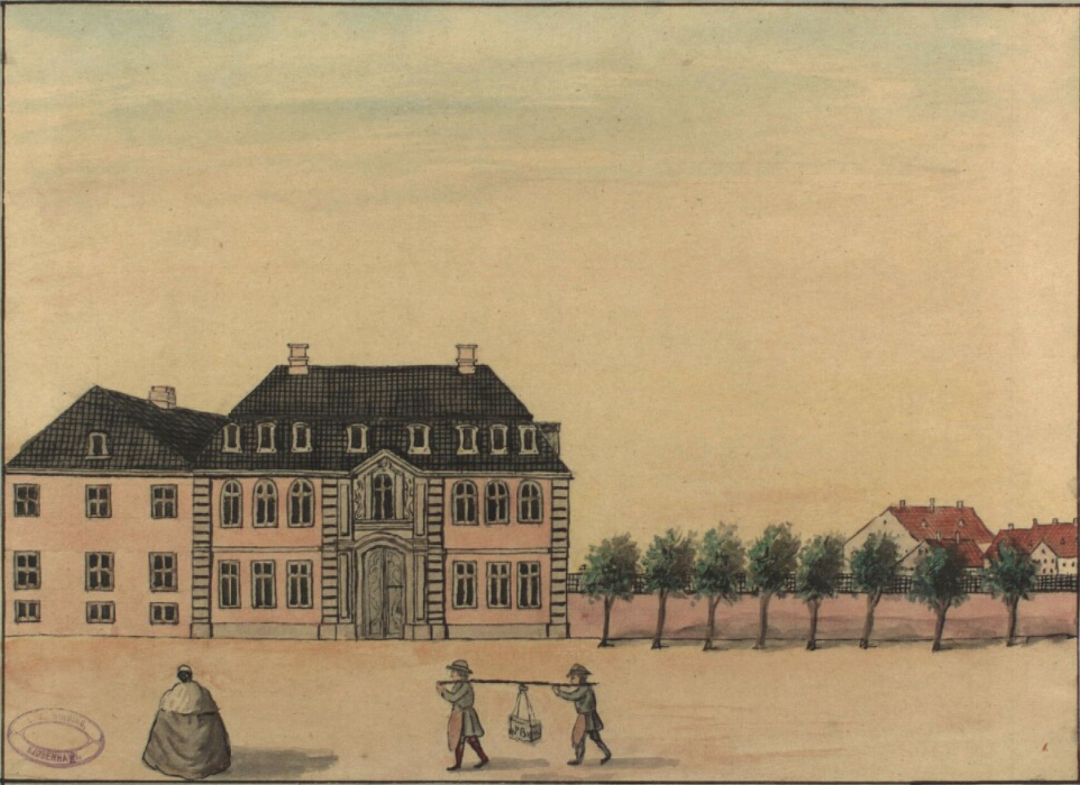
The Gyldensten Mansion in Dronningens Tværgade painted by Rach and Eegberg in c. 1750

The site was originally part of the extensive garden of the Gyldensten Mansion which reached all the way from Bredgade to Store Kongensgade along the south side of Dronningens Tværgade. The house was named after Jean Henri Huguetan, Count Gyldensteen.

In 1793, part of the garden was divided into three long, narrow lots and sold off for redevelopment. The current building was constructed in 1794 together with the adjacent buildings at No. 7 and No. 9 by the master builders Hans Ondrup (1751–1814) and A. Giedde.

=== 19th century ===
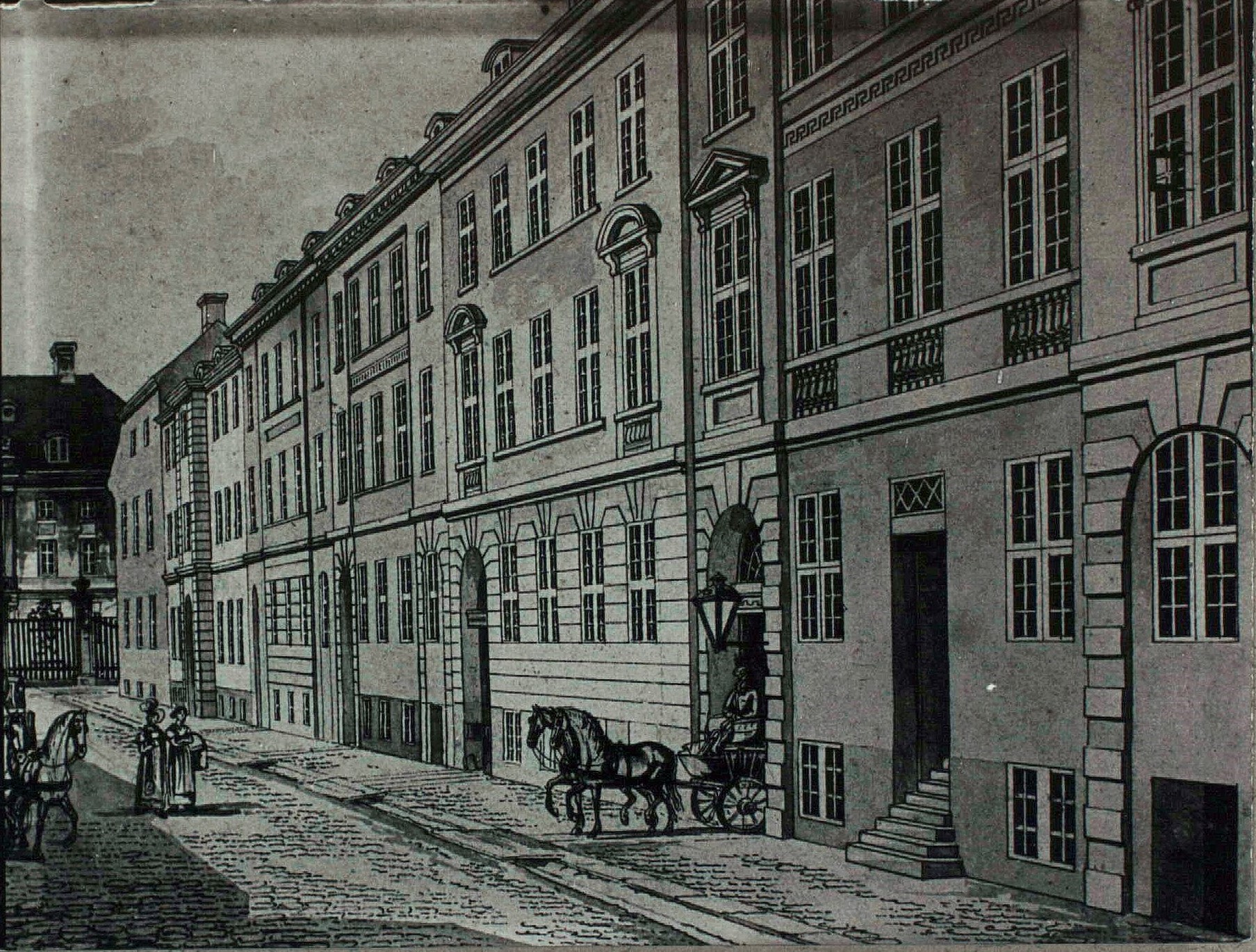
Dronningens Tværgade 1–9, 1825

The property was acquired by general trader (sadsmægler) Jacob Jacobsen (1752–1827). At the time of the 1801 census, he resided in the building with his wife Charlotte Elisabeth Christiane (née Bang), their three children (aged seven to eleven) and his mother Ragnild Jacobsen. Christiane Jacobsen, Jacobsen's widowed sister, shared one of the other apartments with the office clerk Frederik Daniel Eegholm, a caretaker, three maids and the students Frederik Sigfried Vogt (1788–1855) and Hans Henrich Vogt. Frederik Sigfried Vogt would later become a diplomat, and was the father of sculptor and landowner Gundo Seiersfred Vogt.

The property was listed in the new cadastre of 1806 as No. 275. It was at that time still owned by Jacobsen. His daughter Augusta Wilhelmine Jacobsen (1802–1844) married military officer and mathematician Carl Ludvig Bendz.

=== 1840 census ===
At the time of the 1840 census, No. 275 was home to a total of 22 residents. Chatrine Marie Bügel (née Adzer, 1767–1845), widow of Caspar Peter Bügel, resided on the first floor with her niece Thora Lovise Augusta Hansen, lodger Frederick Hinze, two male servants and one maid. Lars Peter Hedermann, a high-ranking Royal Mail official, resided on the second floor with his wife Sophie Hedevig Hedermann, their two sons (aged 19 and 27) and one maid. Jens Peter Petersen, a royal lackey, resided on the ground floor with his wife Maria Petronella Petersen, their 26-year-old son Niels Christian Petersen, the relative Jomfru Ida Andrea Giesling, a male servant and a maid. Johannes Lassen, the proprietor of a tavern in the basement, resided in the associated dwelling with his 15-year old daughter and the lodger Nielsen Ørsted. Carl Frederick Knudsen, the building's concierge, was also residing in the basement with his wife Dorthe Marie Knudsen.

=== 1845 census ===
At the time of the 1845 census, No. 275 was home to 27 residents. Nicolaj Georg Halkiær, one of the owners of G. Halkier & Co., resided in one of the apartments with his wife Henriette Halkiær, their daughter Emilie (aged 13), his mother-in-law Emilie Clausen, 18-year-old Anne Fabricius and 13-year-old Emilie Clausen and two maids. Carl Frid. Normann, a birk judge, resided in the building with his wife Thomine Normann (née Funder), their three children (aged 13 to 18), a male servant and two maids.

=== 1850 census ===
At the time of the 1850 census, No. 275 was once again home to new residents. Fritz Kiær, a chamber page (kammerjunker), resided on the ground floor with his wife Wilhelmine Riis, their two children (aged two and three) and four maids. Peter Georg Bang, a jurist and politician, resided on the first floor with his wife Marie Caroline, their eight children, two male servants and two maids. One of the children was the painter Marie Vilhelmine Bang.

=== Later history ===
Hans Dahlerup (1790-1872), a military officer, resided in one of the apartments in 1852.

== Architecture ==
Dronningens Tværgade 5 is constructed with three storeys above a walk-out basement. The two slightly projecting outer bays are wider than the three central ones. In the outer bay to the left is a gateway topped by a fanlight, and in the one to the right is a basement entrance topped by a hood mould supported by corbels. The two outer bays are on the ground floor finished with shadow joints, a detail first mentioned in 1851. Other decorative elements include blank bands between the central windows on the upper floors and a modillioned cornice. The roof features a three-bay wall dormer, flanked by two smaller dormer windows.

An eight-bay side wing extends from the rear side of the building along the west side of a narrow courtyard. Its facade is dotted with ornamental wall anchors. On the other side of the courtyard is a somewhat shorter and free-standing side wing. At the far end of the courtyard stands a one-storey, detached rear wing. It was originally used as a bank building. The main entrance has a stone portal.

== Today ==
The property is owned today by E/F Dronningens Tværgade 5.
