= Dronningens Tværgade 11 =

Apartment building in Copenhagen, Denmark

Dronningens Rværgade 11
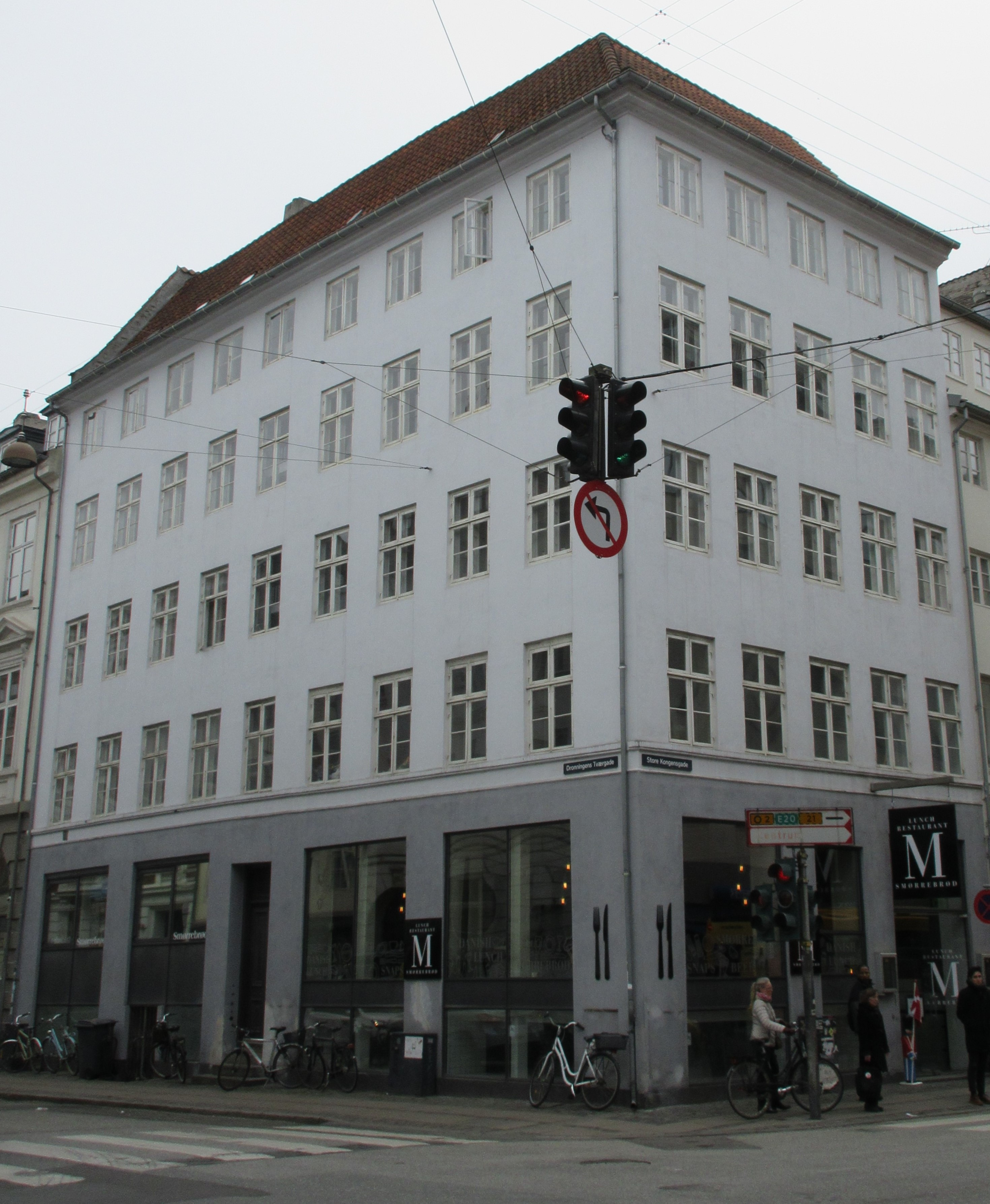
- Interactive map of the Dronningens Rværgade 11 area

General information
- Location: Copenhagen, Denmark
- Coordinates: 55°41′0.49″N 12°35′14.35″E
- Completed: 18th century

Dronningens Rværgade 11/Store Kongensgade 56 is a Neoclassical architecture apartment building situated at the corner of Dronningens Tværgade and Store Kongensgade in central Copenhagen, Denmark. Originating in the two-storey, half-timbered townhouse from before 1754, it owes its current appearance to a renovation in 1846. It was listed in the Danish registry of protected buildings and places in 1974.

== History ==
=== 18th century ===
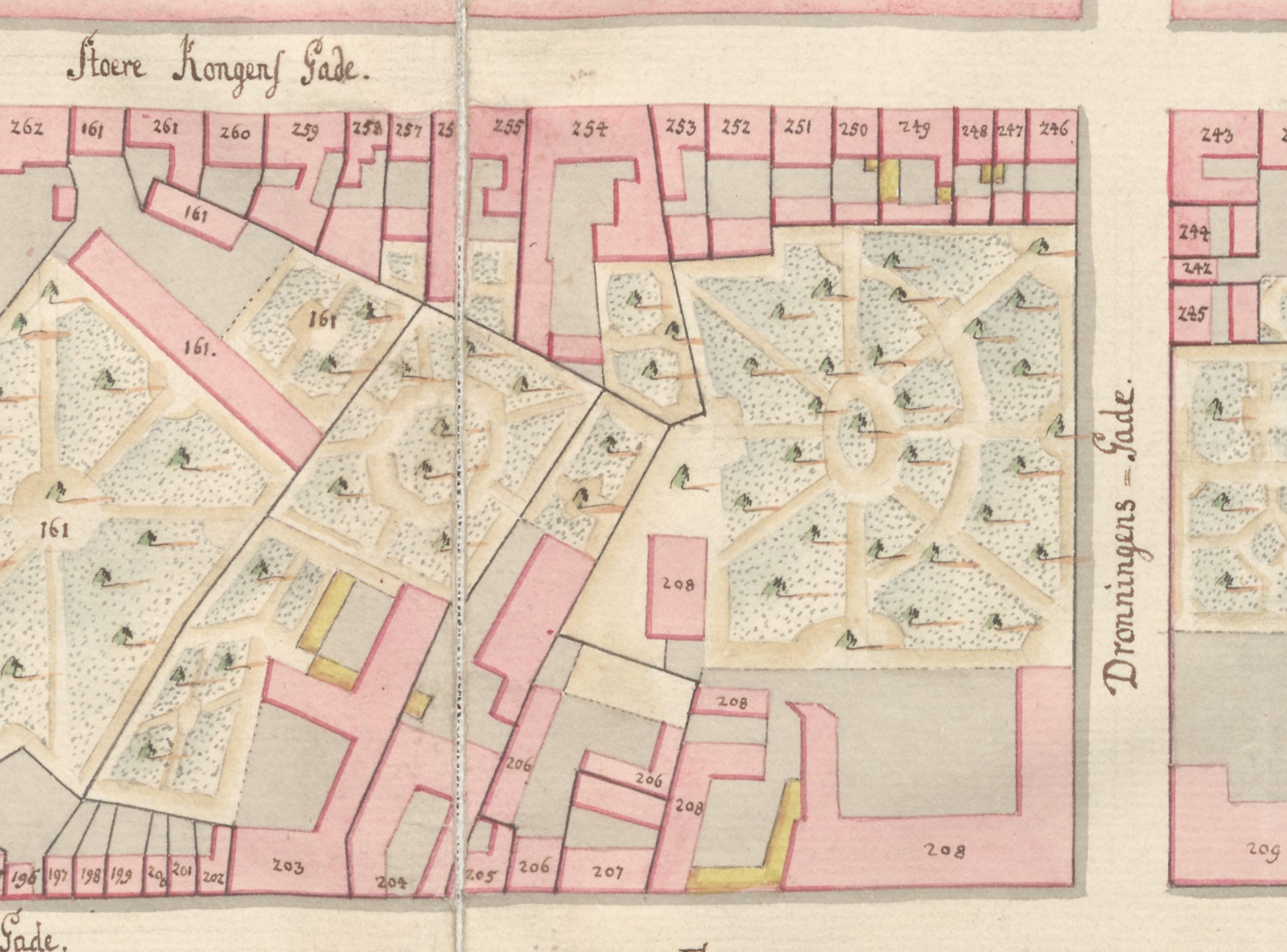
No. 246 seen on a detail from Christian Gedde's map of St. Ann's East Quarter, 1757.

Back in the 17th century, the site was part of Samuel Christoph von Plessen.'s garden. Incirca 1680, he constructed a mansion on the other side of the block, where Hotel Phoenix stands today. His property was listed in Copenhagen's first cadastre from 1689 as No. 131 in St. Ann's East Quarter. A row of small lots on Store Kongensgade were later sold off as independent properties. The small corner property was listed in the new cadastre of 1756 as No. 242 in St. Ann's East Quarter, owned by wheelwright Bastian Jacobsen. No. 27–252 were also created from land that had previously belonged to No. 131 (now No. 208).

=== 19th century ===
In the new cadastre of 1806, the property was listed as No. 242 in St. Ann's East Quarter. It belonged to master joiner Henrik L. Monsees at that time.

The property was home to 25 residents at the 1840 census. August Wolff, a master barber, resided on the ground floor with his wife Marie Friis, their 30-year-old unmarried daughter Frederike Amalie Wolff and the barber (employee) Wilhelm Orthstein. Jens Peter Petersen, a brick-layer, resided on the ground floor with his wife Anne Kirstine Løgstrup and one maid. Frederik Christian Hoffmann, a captain-lieutenant on paid stand-by (ventepenge), resided on the first floor with the widow (of a captain) Ingeborg Boeck and the latter's 32-year-old daughter Emilie Boeck. Christiane Lindberg, widow of one captain Freog, resided on the first floor with a maid. Thomas Jacobsen, a grocer (høker), resided on the second floor and in the basement with his wife Bolette Weløe, their eight-year-old daughter, his sister Marie Jacobsen and his brother-in-law Hans Petersen. Christiane Holm, widow of amundskænk, resided on the same floor. Kirstine Olsen (née Nielsen), widow of a lackey, resided on the third floor. Anne Kirstine Hansen (née Dalhoff), another widow of a lackey, resided on the fourth floor with 28-year-old Caroline Marie Petersen and one maid. Wilhelm Kragerop. a master plumber, resided in the basement with his wife Dorthea Olsen and their 19-year-old daughter.

=== 20th century ===
The jeweller August Thomsen's Enke ("August Thomsen's Eidow# was based in the building in 1950. The firm was founded in 1856 by V. Christensen. In 1888, he took August Thomsen as a partner. In 1006, Thomsen became the sole owner of the company. In 1916, it was converted into an aktieselskab, which was dissolved in 1933. The shop was then continued by Thomsen's widow D. U. Thomsen. In 1932, Aug. Thomsen A/S was awarded the predicate of proveuor to the Court of Denmark.

== Architecture ==
The building is constructed with five storeys ov er a walk-out basement, with a nine-bay-long facade towards Dronningens Tværgade and a five-bay-long facade towards Store Kongensgade. The building's main entrance is located in the central bay towards Dronningens Rvæergade. The plastered facade is finished with a cornice band above the ground floor and a simple cornice. The pitched roof is clad in red tiles. A short side wing with a monopitched red tile roof extends from the rear side of the building (in Dronningens Tværgade).

== Today ==
The building contains a shop in the basement, a restaurant on the ground floor and two condominiums on each of the three upper floors.
