= Store Strandstræde 20 =

Historic building in Copenhagen, Denmark

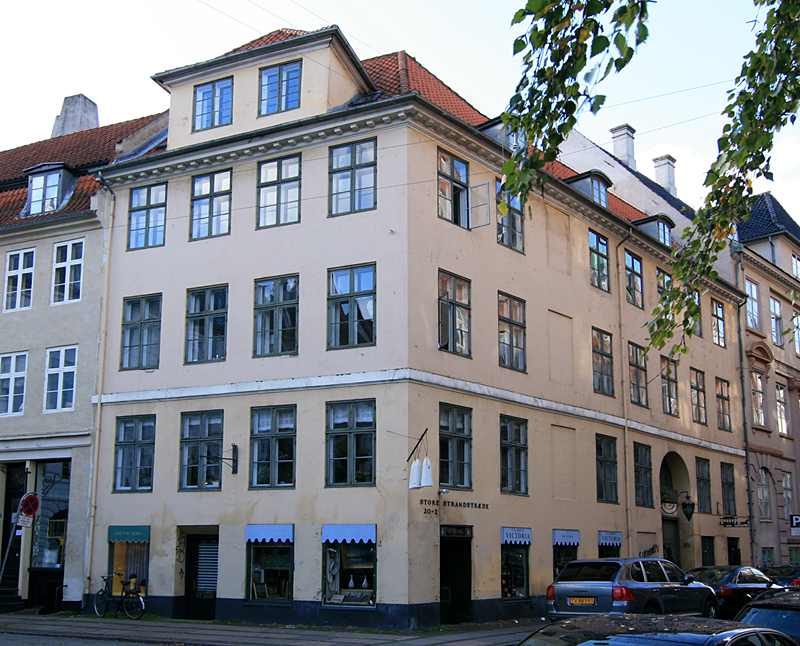
- Interactive map of the Store Strandstræde 20 area

General information
- Location: Copenhagen, Denmark
- Coordinates: 55°40′52.46″N 12°35′22.79″E
- Completed: 1799

Store Strandstræde 20 is a historic property located at the corner of Store Strandstræde and Lille Strandstræde in central Copenhagen, Denmark. The building was from the early 19th century until 1960 operated as a hotel. It was listed in the Danish registry of protected buildings and places in 1950.

== History ==
=== 18th century ===
The property was listed in Copenhagen's first cadastre from 1689 as No. 51 in St. Ann's East Quarter (Sankt Annæ Øster Kvarter), owned by one Christen Pedersen's widow. It was listed in the new cadastre of 1756 as No. 111 in St. Ann's East Quarter, owned by Icelandic merchant Thomas Balle.

The present building on the site was constructed in 1797–1799 for merchants Hans Kye and Wilhelm Helt.

=== 19th century ===
The property was listed in the new cadastre of 1806 as No. 78 in St. Ann's East Quarter. It was at that time owned by Hansen & Chr. Gregersen.

The priest N.F.S. Grundtvig lived in the building for around a month in October–November 1815. His next home was in a now demolished building at Sankt Peders Stræde 14.

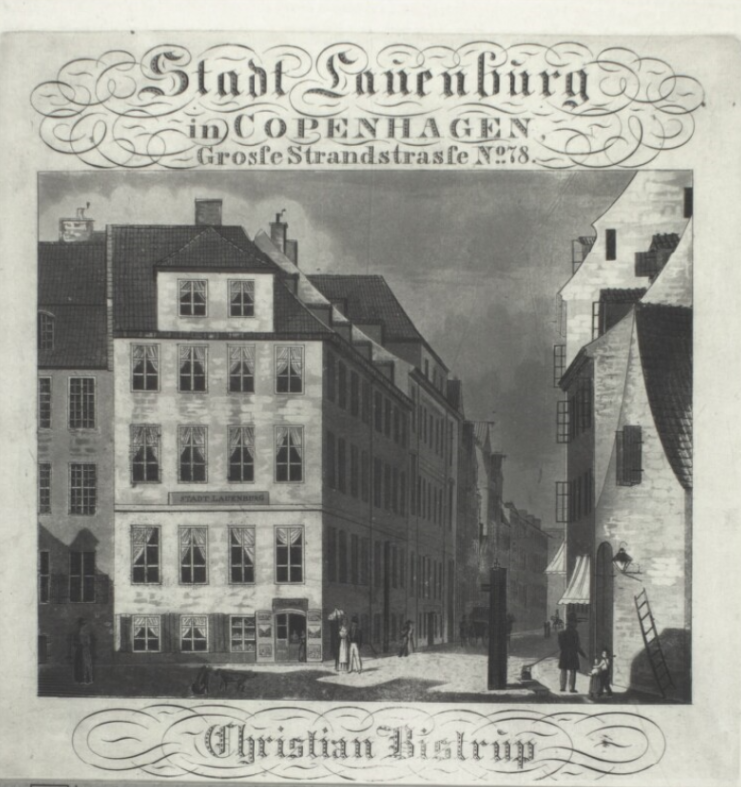
Hotel Stadt Lauenburg

The building was at some point converted into a hotel under the name Stadt Lauenborg. It belonged to William Murdoch (1785-1850). He was the son of Scottish engineer and inventor William Murdoch. In around 1837, he parted with the property after buying a larger one at the corner of Bredgade and Dronningens Tværgade in 1837 and converted it into another hotel under the name Hotel Stadt Hamburg.

Hotel Stadt Lauenberg was later operated by Christian Bistrup. He was an account customer in W. Raascho's wine business at the corner of Store Kongensgade and Gothersgade.

=== 20th century ===
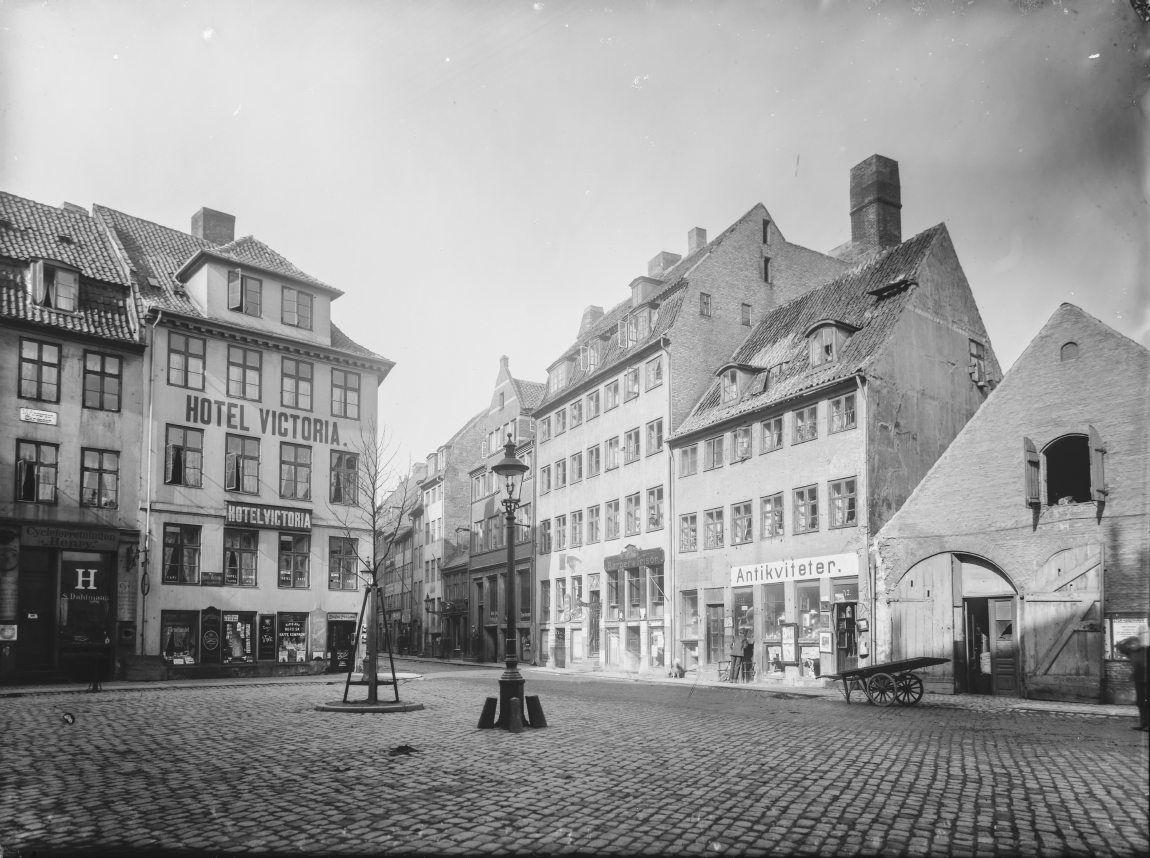
Hotel Victoria (left), photographed by Johannes Hauerslev in the 1900s

The name of the hotel in Store Strandstræde was changed to Hotel Victoria in circa 1900. It closed in 1960.

== Architecture ==
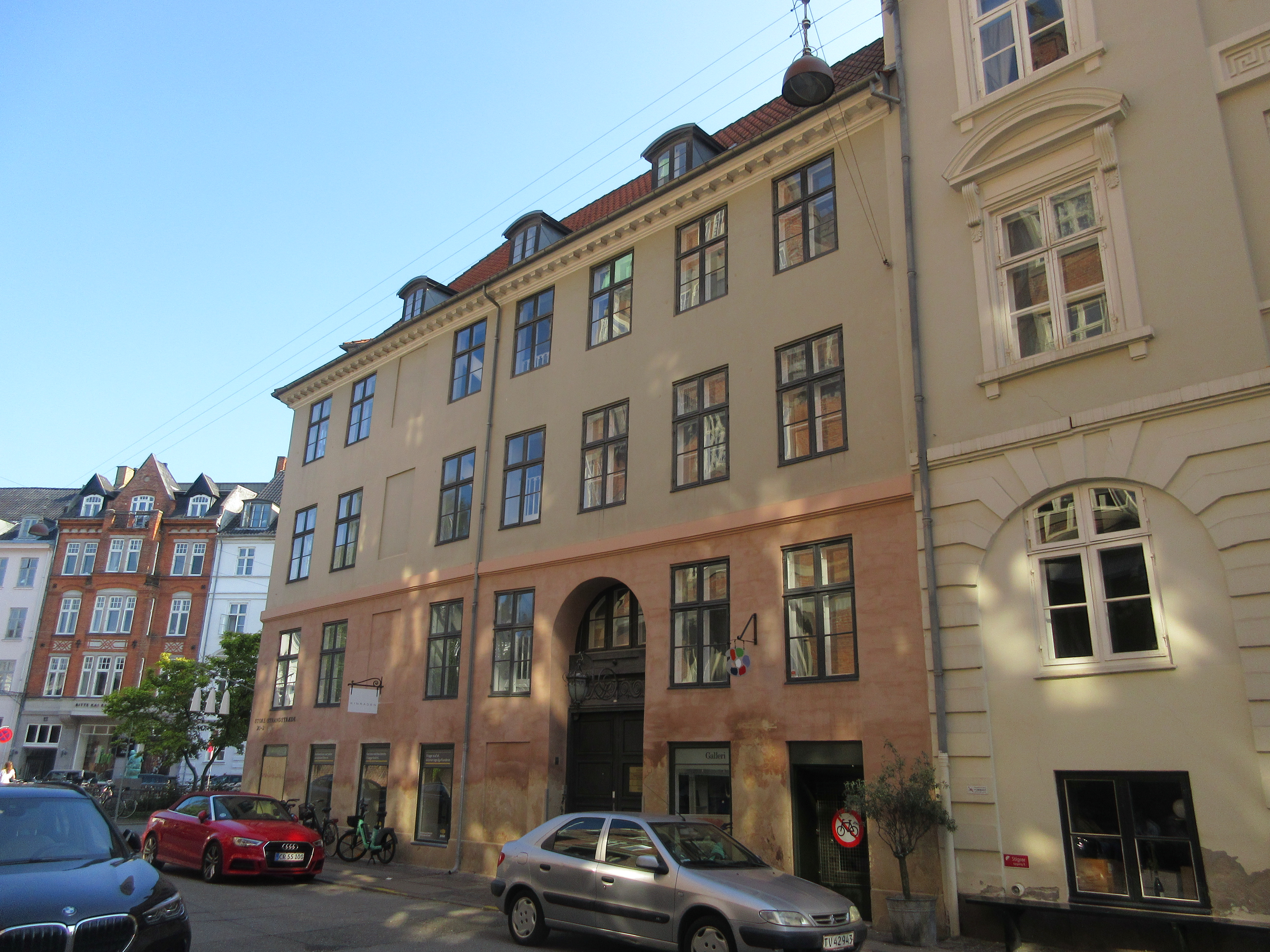
The building, viewed from Store Strandstræde

The three-storey building has eight bays towards Store Strandstræde and four bays towards Lille Strandstræde. The avscence of a chamfered corner bay is atypical for buildings constructed immediately after the Copenhagen Fire of 1795 since this was normally a requirement under the new Copenhagen Building Act. The facade on Lille Strandstræde is crowned by a two-bay gabled dormer.

== Today ==
An antique toys and dolls store is based in the ground floor. The upper floors are offices. Companies based the building include Casa Nord.
