= 71 Nyhavn Hotel =

Hotel in Denmark

71 Nyhavn
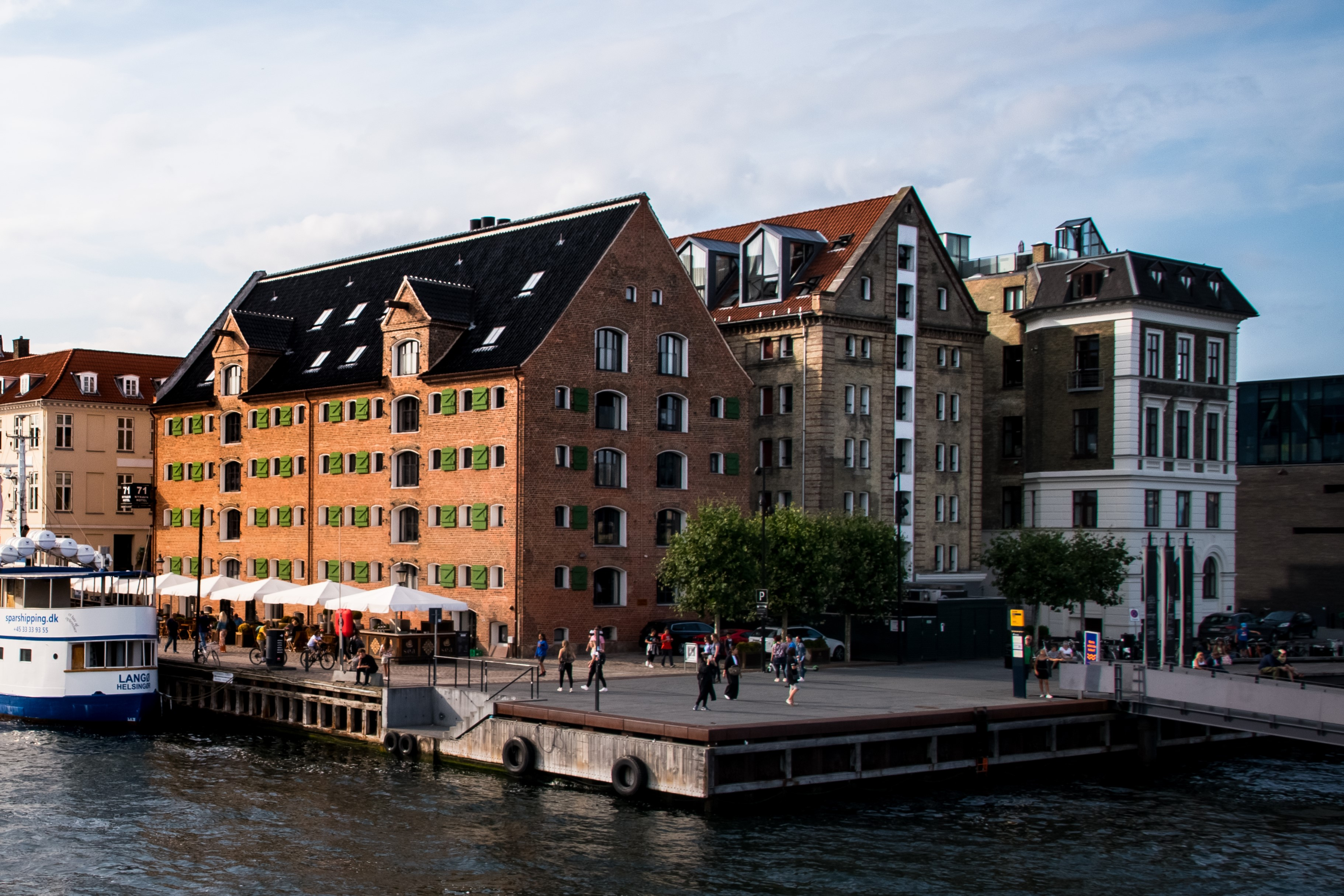
- Interactive map of the 71 Nyhavn area

General information
- Location: Nyhavn, Copenhagen, Denmark
- Coordinates: 55°40′45.5″N 12°35′37″E
- Opening: 1971; 55 years ago
- Owner: Arp-Hansen Hotel Group
- Operator: Arp-Hansen Hotel Group

Other information
- Number of rooms: 150
- Number of restaurants: 1

Website
- Hotel web site

71 Nyhavn is a high-end hotel based in two converted warehouses on the corner of the Nyhavn Canal and the main harbour front of Copenhagen, Denmark. It has 150 rooms and is after an upgrade completed in 2018 Arp-Hansen Hotel Group's most expensive hotel.

== History ==
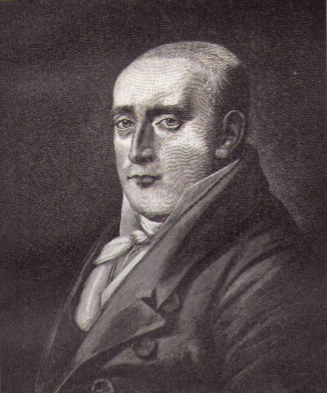
Ole Berendt Suhr by Christian Hornemann

The building, also known as the Suhr Warehouse (Danish: Suhr's Pakhus), was built in 1805 by Ole Berendt Suhr (1762–1815) and Ludvigsen, his business partner. It was listed in 1918.

In 1971, the building was restored and adapted by the architects Flemming Hertz and O. Ramsgaard Thomsen and converted into a hotel which opened the following year. In 2000, the hotel was extended with the Puggaard Warehouse (Danish: Puggaards Pakhus), a yellow building from about 1850 located on the rear side of the Suhr Warehouse. It was originally used for the storage of spices from the Far East.

== Architecture ==
The building is built in red brick and has 14 bays along Nyhavn and four bays along the main harbour front

== Today ==
71 Nyhavn is a four star hotel with a total of 150 rooms and suites. The number of rooms in the red warehouse was reduced from 84 to 64 in connection with the most recent refurbishment of the hotel. The yellow warehouse contains 66 rooms. Other facilities include a restaurant and a meeting room.

== Image gallery ==
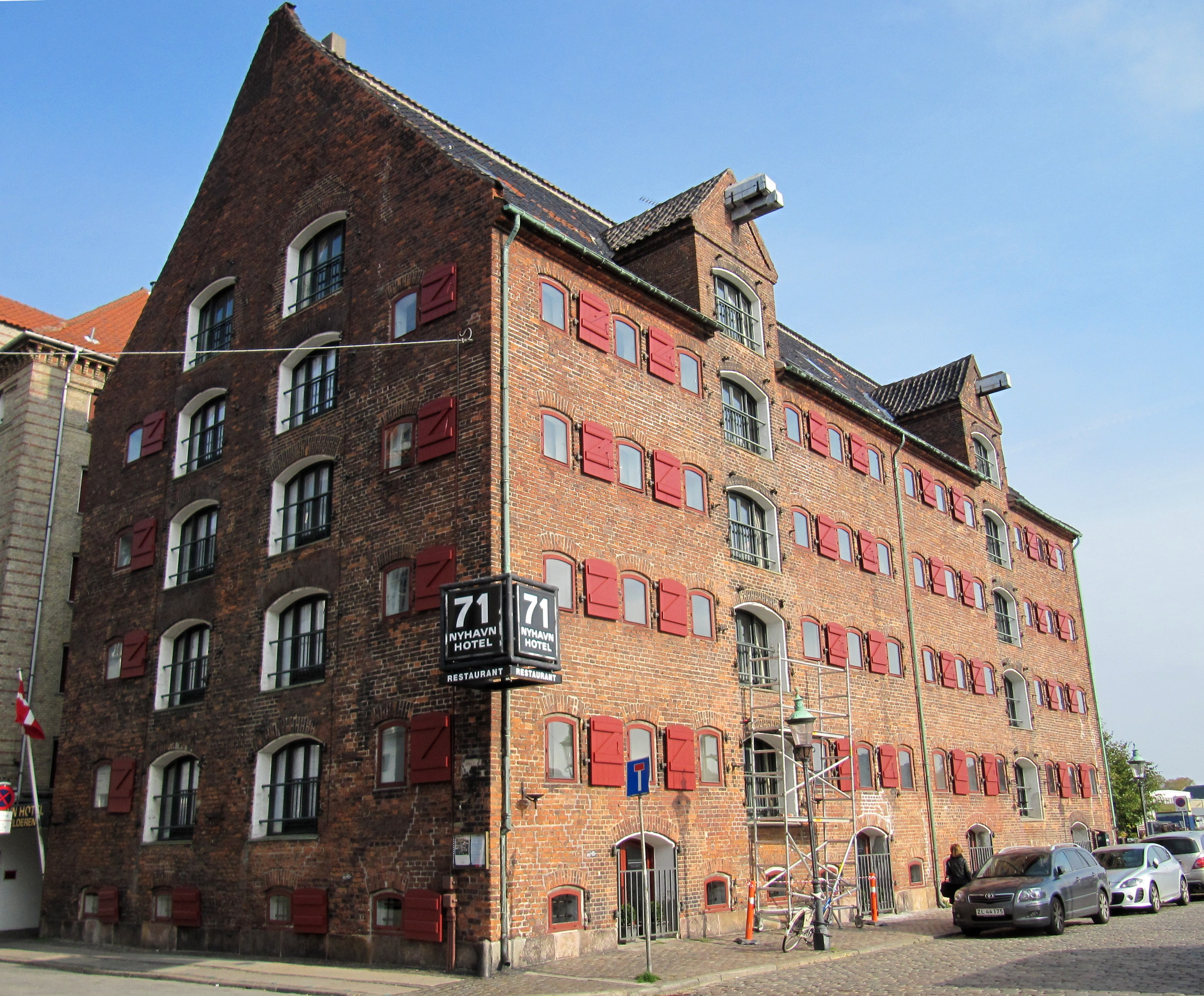
From Nyhavn

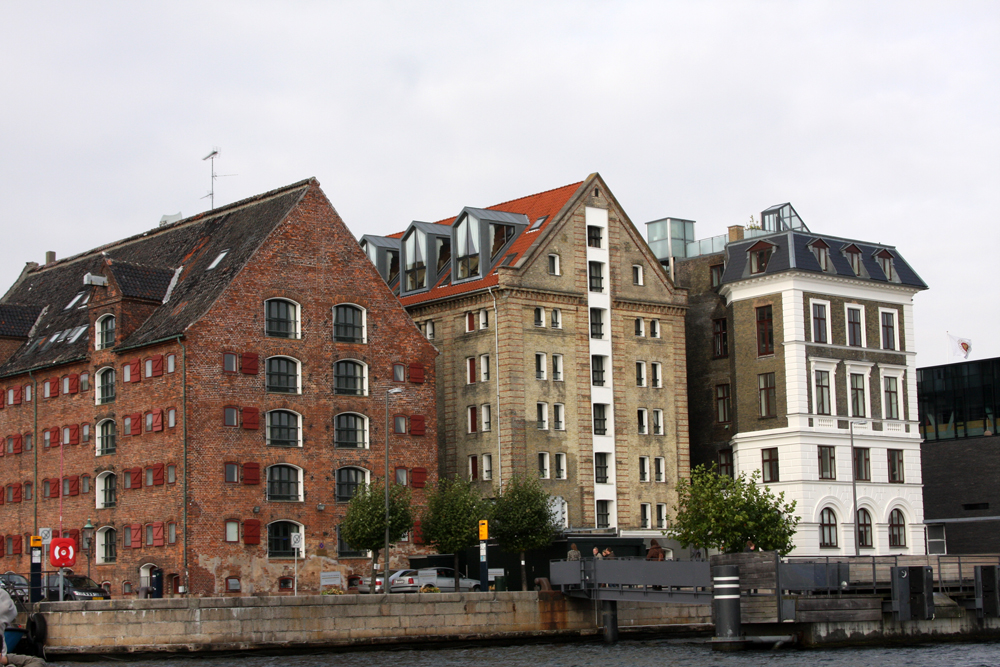
The alley in front of the building

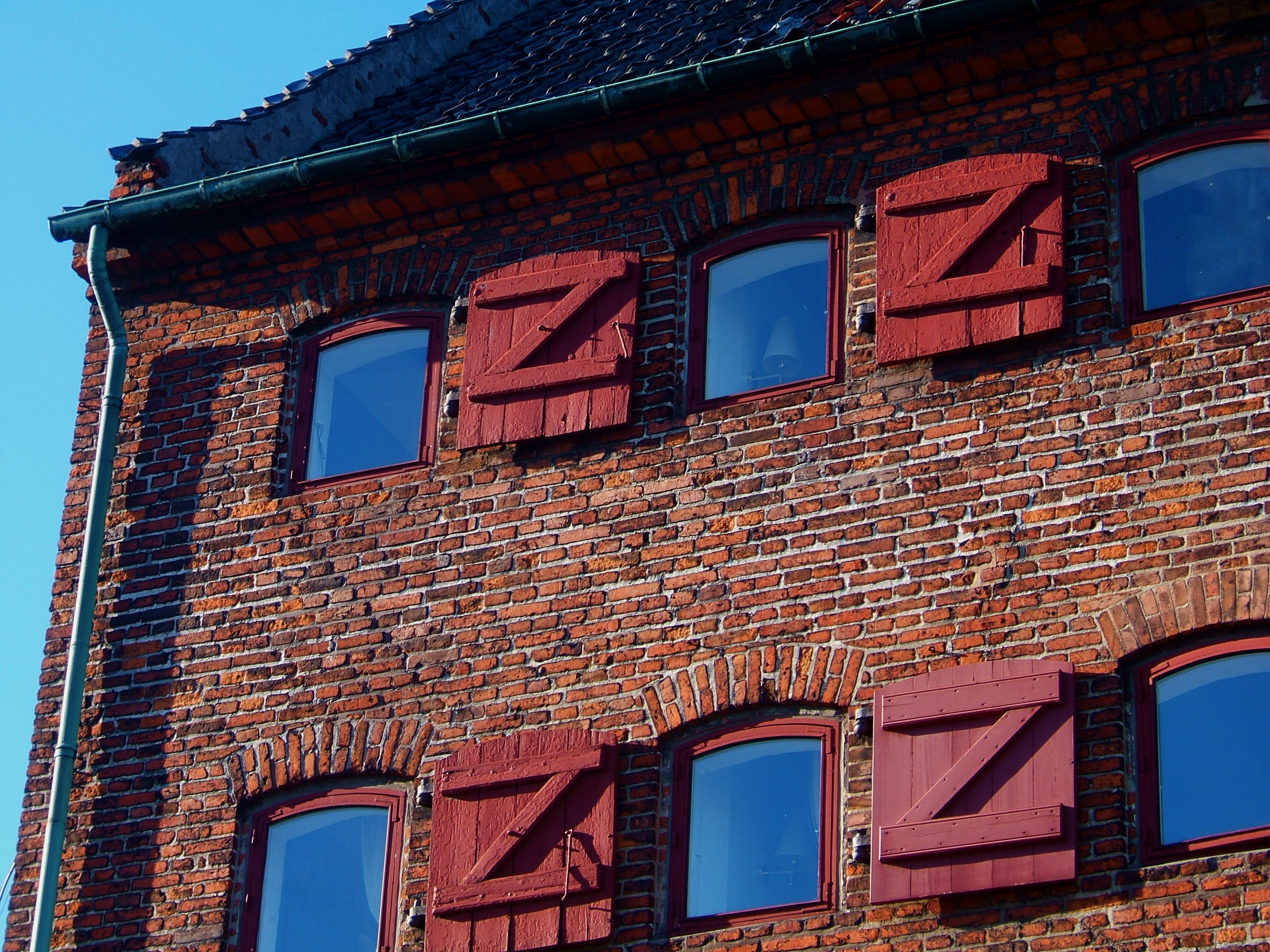
Red shutters

== See also ==
- Arp-Hansen Hotel Group
