= Jean Henri Desmercières =

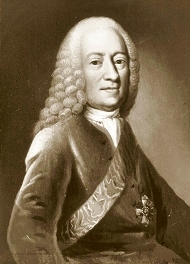
- Desmercières painted by Peder Als
- Born: 8 May 1687; Paris, France
- Died: 8 March 1778 (aged 90); Copenhagen, Denmark
- Awards: Order of the Elephant (1878)

Jean Henri Desmercières (8 May 1687 – 8 March 1778) was a French-Danish merchant, banker and major landowner in Holstein, where he reclaimed large areas along the North Sea coast.

== Early life ==
Born in Paris on 8 May 1687, Desmercières was the illegitimate son of Jean Henri Huguetan and a woman in the fashion industry. He was named for the fashion street Rue des Merciers, where Desmercières was allegedly born. He was apprenticed to his father's trading house in Paris and later led its office in London. He then moved to Berlin where he became a chamberlain for Frederick William I of Prussia.

== Career in Denmark ==
In 1736, Desmercières moved to Copenhagen where his father had arranged for him to become a member of the Kammerkollegiet. He was responsible for issues related to fishing from 1753, but was apart from that mainly engaged in banking and trade. He remained a member of Kammerkollegiet until 1768 and, from January through March 1767, served as its president. He was involved in the establishment of Kurantbanken. He was also a major stakeholder in the Danish Asiatic Company and the first director of the Danish Africa Company, which was founded in 1755.

He belonged to Count Johann Hartwig Ernst von Bernstorff's social circle, but was apparently not held in very high regard by him. It is believed that Desmercières was critical of Bernstorff's policy of subsidizing industrial enterprises.

== Holdings in Holstein ==
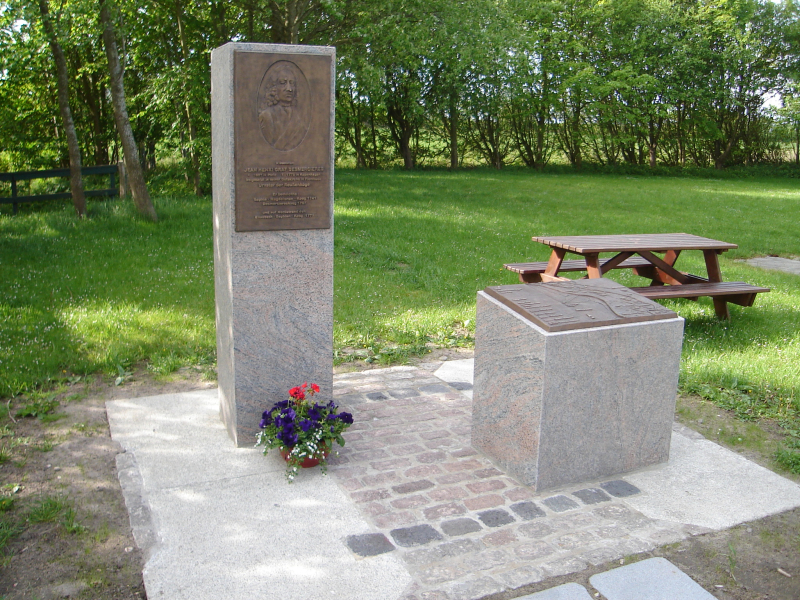
Memorial in honor of Jean Henri Desmercieres for his reclamation of Sophien-Magdalenen-Koog, Desmerciereskoog, and Elisabeth-Sopien-Koog

Desmercières was a major landowner in Holstein. He owned Quarnbek as well as Emkendorf from 1743 to 1764.

He was a pioneer in land reclamation in the Holstein area, where he reclaimed the bay at Bredstedt, creating three polders (Danish: koog). He constructed dykes which were about 16 ft (4.9 metres) tall and sloped towards the sea, similar earlier Dutch projects. Then the director of a bank in Copenhagen, he financed the construction of the dykes by selling off parcels of the newly created marshland at a profit.

The new area was named Desmerciereskoog after him (lit. 'Desmerciéres' Polder'). Another reclaimed area was named Elisabeth-Sophien-Koog, after his wife. The work was continued by Heinrich XLIII, Count Reuss of Ebersdorf, a nephew of Desmercières' half sister Marguerite Huguetan, Countess Gyldensteen. A memorial to Desmercières was unveiled in the area in 2004.

== Personal life ==
Being an illegitimate son, Desmercières inherited neither his father's titles nor the Countship of Gyldensteen at the event of his death in 1749. His father had, however, given him the town mansion in Bredgade (now Hotel Phoenix Copenhagen) as well as the country house Rustenborg at Kongens Lyngby the year before his death.

Desmercières was an active member of the French Reformed congregation in Copenhagen. He was active as one of the congregation's elders for many years and often was the churchwarden on Sundays, standing by the church door with a collection plate.

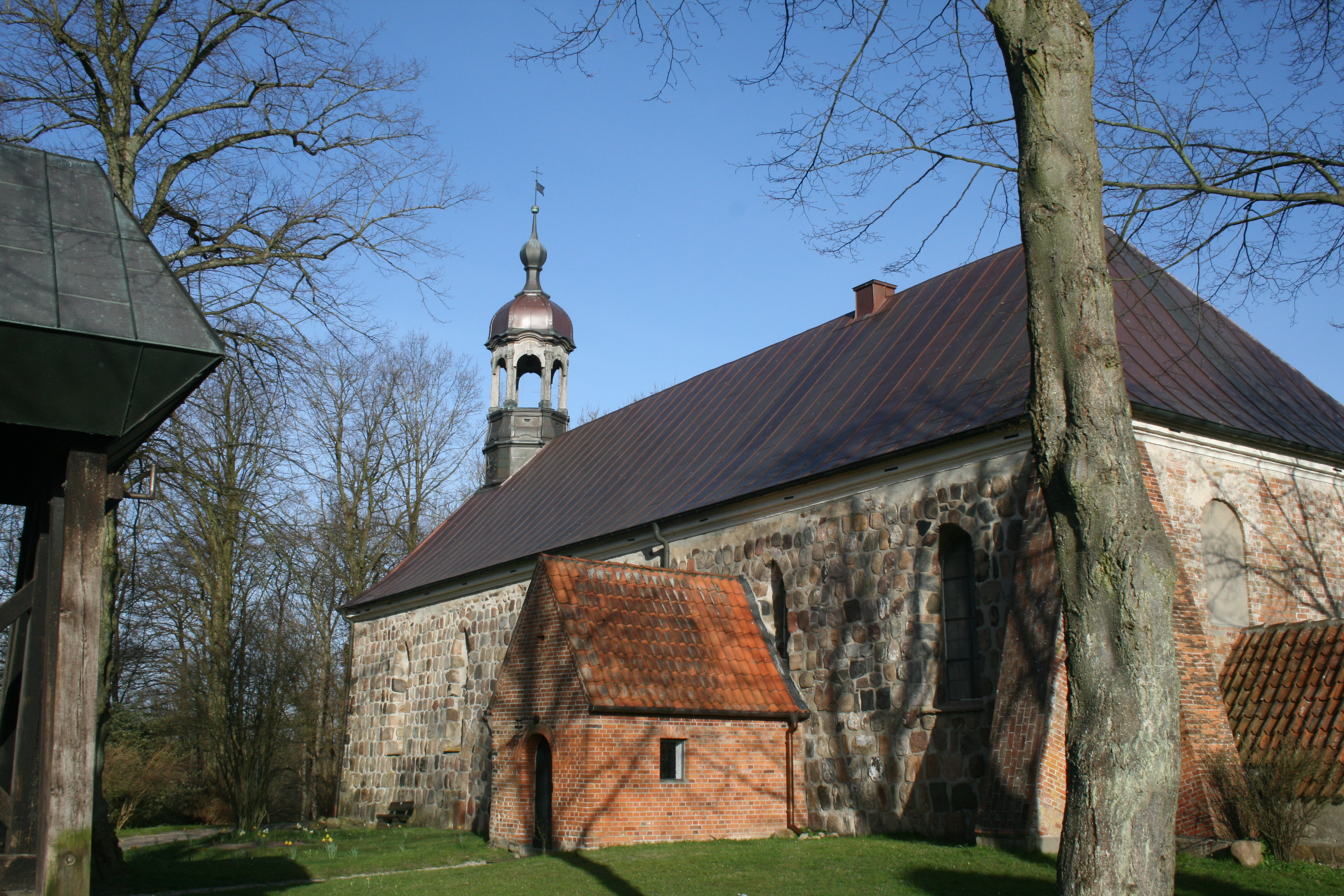
Church of St. George and Mauritius with Desmercières tomb to the right

He married Elisabeth Sophie Frijs at Frijsenborg on 25 June 1751. His marriage was likely motivated by her title; as an illegitimate son, he had to marry into the nobility to become recognized as part of it. She was the daughter of General-Lieutenant Count Christian Friis (1691–1763) and Countess Øllegaard Gersdorff (1687–1734). She became the holder of the countship of Frijsenborg upon the death of her sister Christine Sophie Friis in 1787.

He was appointed Konferensråd in 1727 and Gehejmeråd in 1745. He was created Knight of the Order of the Elephant in 1768 and Gehejmekonferensråd in 1775. On 22 February 1776, he was naturalized and ennobled by letters patent. Having no sons, the Desmercières noble family died with him just two years later. He is buried at Church of St. George and Mauritius in Flemhude, part of Quarnbek.
