= Arp-Hansen Hotel Group =

Hotel group in Denmark

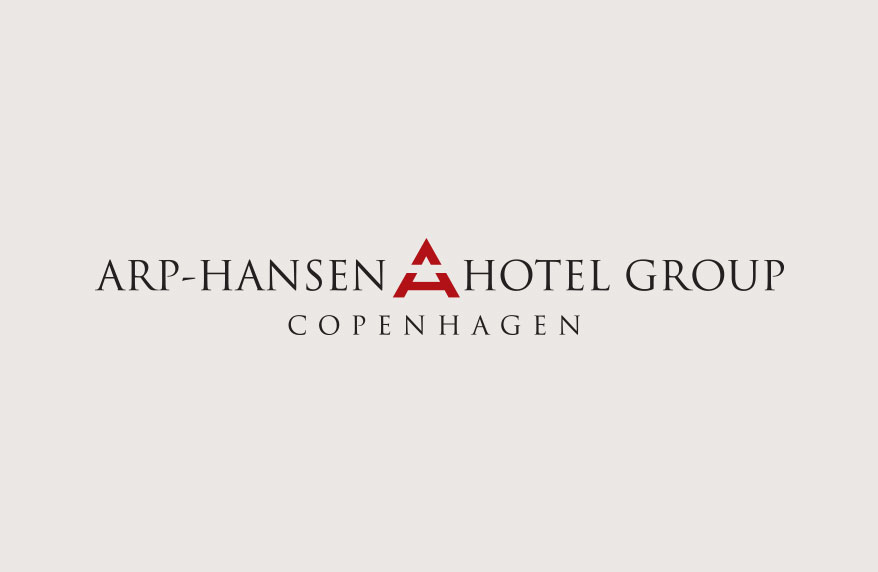
- Company type: Private
- Industry: Hotel
- Founded: 1960
- Founder: Alf Arp-Hansen
- Headquarters: Denmark
- Number of locations: 12 hotels
- Key people: Dorte Krak (CEO); Henning Arp-Hansen (chairman)
- Website: www.arp-hansen.com

The Arp-Hansen Hotel Group is a hotel group based in Copenhagen, Denmark. The group has 12 hotels (approx. 4,000 rooms) in Copenhagen and Aarhus.

== History ==
The company was founded in 1960 when Alf Arp-Hansen acquired the Gjentofte Kro (Inn) (later renamed Gentofte Hotel). In 1971, Arp-Hansen opened the first warehouse hotel in Copenhagen, the 71 Nyhavn Hotel. The Hotel Opera opened shortly after, and the hotels Christian IV and Grand Hotel opened in 1986. In 1991, Arp-Hansen acquired the Hotel Phoenix Copenhagen.

In 1998, Alf Arp-Hansen died and his two sons, Henning and Birger, took over. In 2000, the group opened the Strand Hotel. In 2003, Dorte Krak became the CEO of the company. The same year, the group inaugurated The Square hotel, and acquired the Imperial Hotel the following year.

In 2006, Arp-Hansen launched the construction of the Copenhagen Island hotel designed by architect Kim Utzon, who also designed the Tivoli Hotel & Congress Center inaugurated in 2010. In 2009, the group introduced its "Wakeup" concept, a more affordable offer that has been rolled out to four of its hotels as of 2019.

In 2013, the Arp-Hansen group partnered with Tivoli to build a 12-floor, 288-room hotel next to the Tivoli Hotel & Congress Center. The two groups have been in a mutual partnership since 2008. In 2015, the group offloaded the Hotel Opera from its assets, followed by the Grand Hotel in 2017.

In October 2018 Arp-Hansen Hotel Group opened a brand new Wakeup hotel at a very central location. The new hotel has 585 rooms located on the corner of Bernstorffsgade and Kalvebod Brygge. In 2018, the sales of the Arp-Hansen Group reached DKK 1.3 billion, making it the largest hotel chain of Denmark.

== Description ==
The Arp-Hansen Hotel Group consists of privately owned, centrally located hotels. The Arp-Hansen Hotel Group covers approximately 22% of the room capacity in Copenhagen and has, in addition, more than 100 meeting and conference rooms and one congress hall.

Henning Arp Hansen owns 51 percent of the company. His younger brother owns 39 per cent, and CEO Dorthe Krak owns the remaining 10 per cent of the company.

== Locations ==
- 71 Nyhavn Hotel
- Copenhagen Island
- Copenhagen Strand
- Imperial Hotel
- Gentofte Hotel
- Phoenix Copenhagen
- The Square
- Wakeup Copenhagen
- Wakeup Aarhus
- Tivoli Hotel
- Steel House Copenhagen (in the previous building of the Danish Union of Metalworkers)
