= Hotel Phoenix Copenhagen =

Hotel in Copenhagen, Denmark

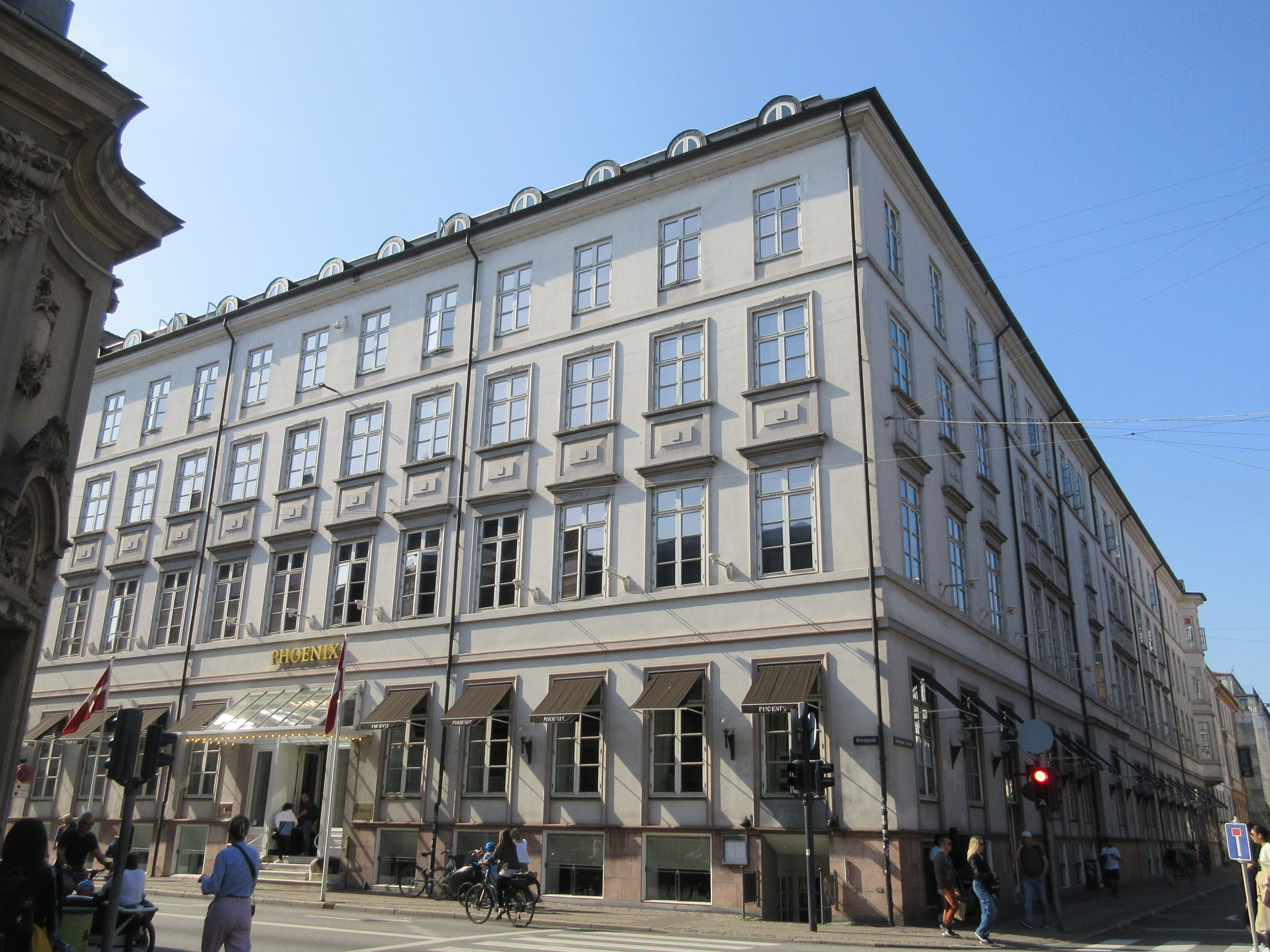
- Interactive map of the Hotel Phoenix Copenhagen area

General information
- Location: Copenhagen, Denmark
- Coordinates: 55°40′58.4″N 12°35′19.9″E
- Opening: 1991; 35 years ago
- Owner: Arp-Hansen Hotel Group
- Operator: Arp-Hansen Hotel Group

Other information
- Number of rooms: 213
- Number of restaurants: 1

Website
- Hotel web site

Hotel Phoenix Copenhagen is a hotel located at the corner of Bredgade (No. 37) and Dronningens Tværgade (No. 1-3) in Copenhagen, Denmark. The first Hotel Phoenix opened at the site in 1848 but closed when it was confiscated by the Germans during World War II. After the war, it was converted into a new headquarters for the Danish Communist Party and the newspaper Land og Folk. The building was acquired by Arp-Hansen Hotel Group in 1990 and reopened as a hotel the following year. It is mentioned in Jules Verne's Journey to the Center of the Earth,

== History ==
=== Fleischer, Plessen and Gyldensteen ===
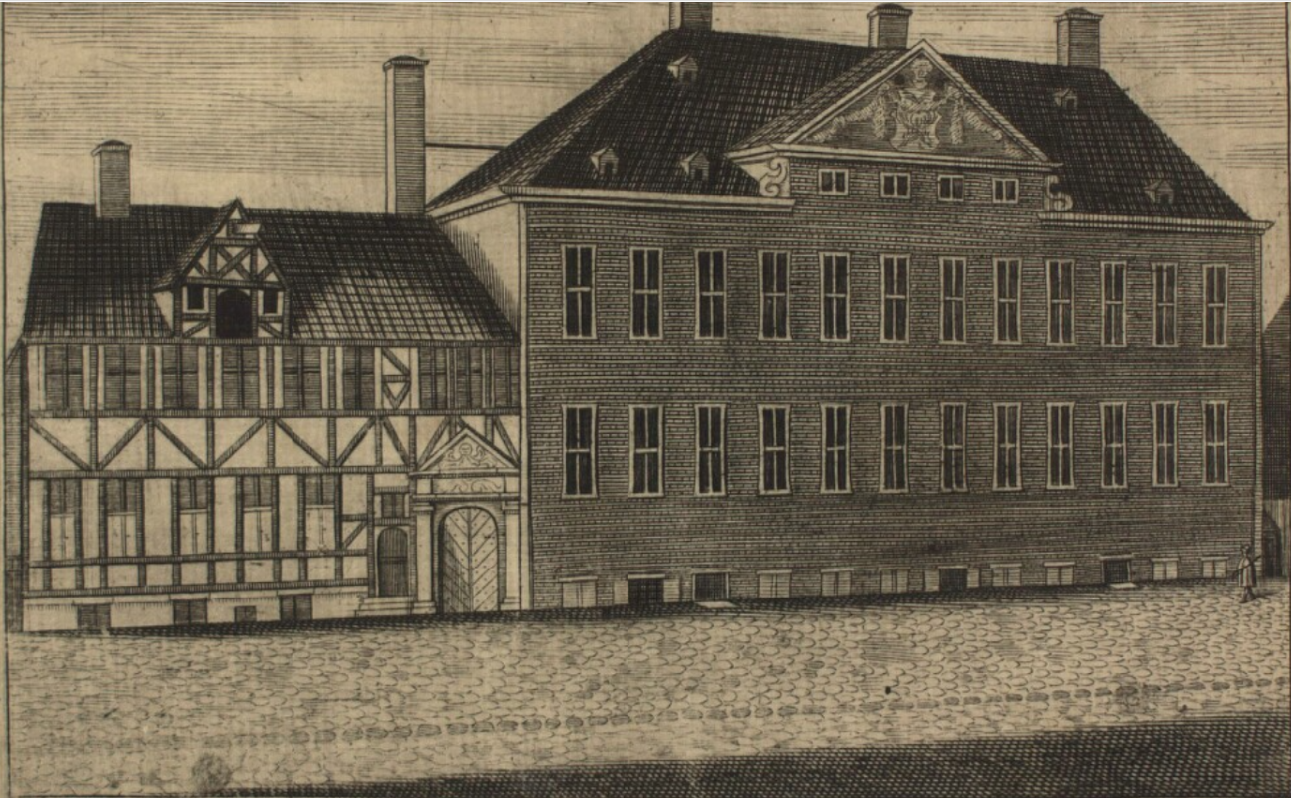
The Plessen Mansion

The still undeveloped site at the corner of Bredgade and Dronningens Tværgade was in the middle of the 17th century owned by the pharmacist Esaias Fleischer. He was the owner of The Lion Pharmacy on Amagertorv as well as property in several other locations in the city. In 1670, a few years after his death, it was sold to Hans Arenfeld, a nobleman and owner of Knivholt Manor at Frederikshavn.

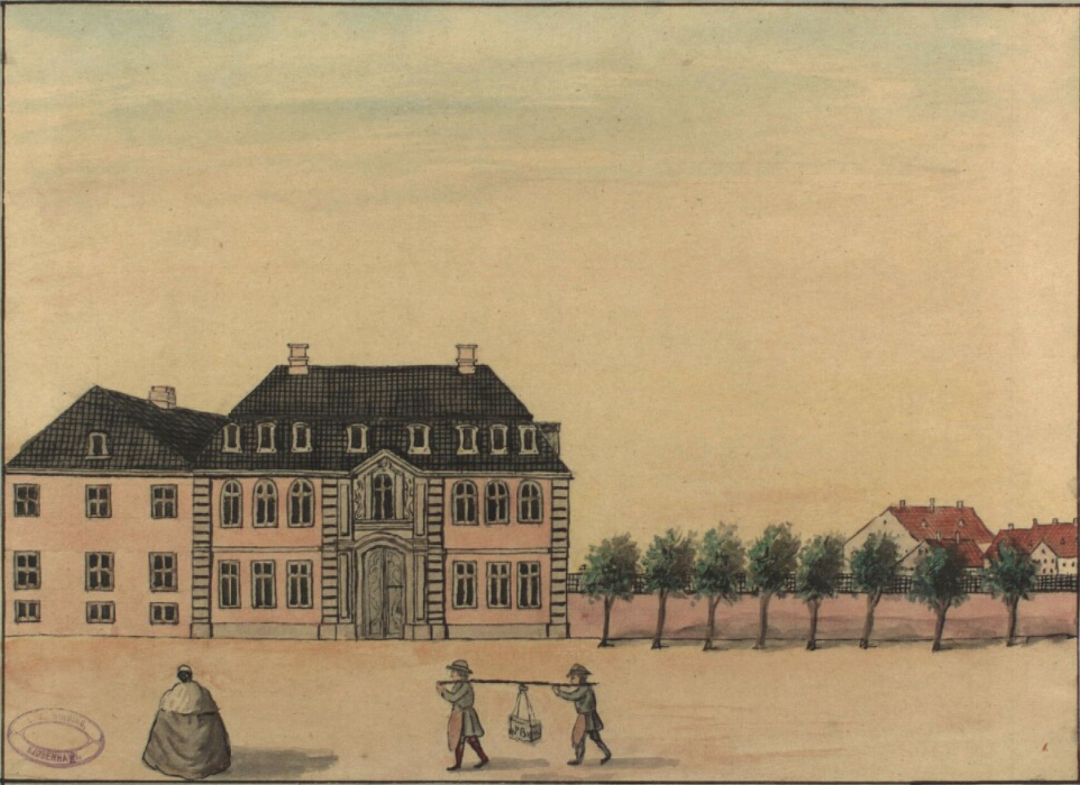
The Gyldensten Mansion in Dronningens Tværgade painted by Rach and Eegberg in c. 1750

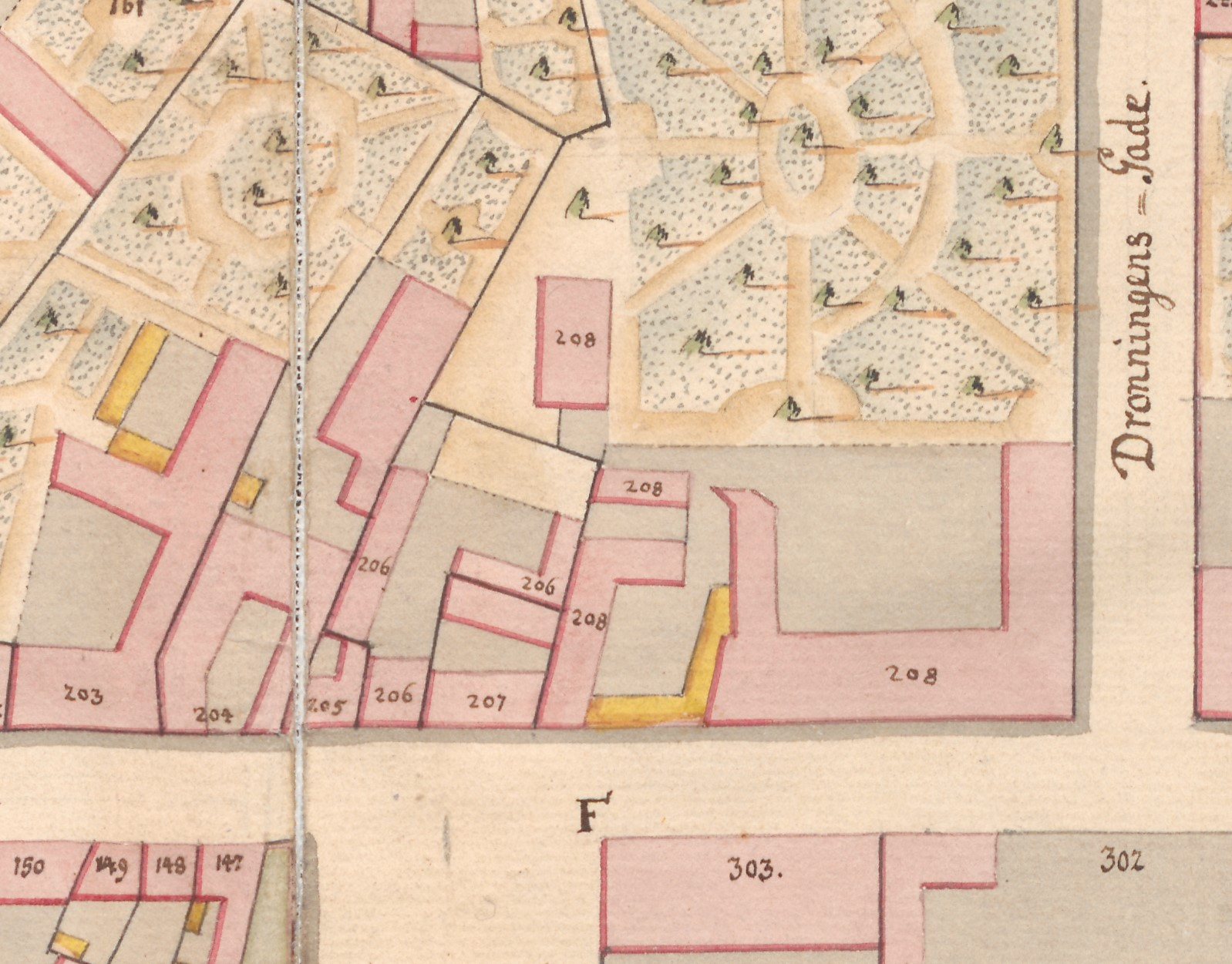
No. 208 seen on a detail from Christian Gedde's map of St. Ann's East Quarter, 1757.

The property was later acquired by commander of the Royal Horse Guards Samuel Christoph von Plessen. In circa 1680, he constructed a two-storey town mansion at the site. He left Copenhagen when the Royal Horse Guards were moved to Møn in 1685 but kept the house in Bredgade. The site was formally made up of two separate properties. They were listed in Copenhagen's first cadastre of 1689 as No. 99 and No. 131 in St.. Ann's East Quarter. Their value was at the time of his death in 1704 estimated at 16,000 Danish rigsdaler.

The property was later acquired by count Jean Henri Huguetan Gyldensteen. He adapted the building in 1740. Gyldensteen passed the house on to his illegitimate son Jean Henri Desmercières in 1749. He constructed a new wing towards Dronningens Tværgade as an individual Rococo-style town mansion. The property (formerly No. 99 and No. 131) was listed in the new cadastre of 1756 as No. 208 in St. Ann's East Quarter.

Jean Henri Desmercières died in 1778. His widow Elisabeth Sophie (née Friis) kept the town mansion after her husband's death. She lived there with a large staff and some lodgers at the time of the 1787 census.

In the early 1790s, No. 208 was divided into a number of smaller properties, leading to the creation of the properties now known as Bredgade 33, Bredgade 35, Dronningens Tværgade 5, Dronningens Tværgade 7 and Dronningens Tværgade 9.

The corner property was subsequently referred to as No. 208A. At the turn of the 19th century, it was owned by grocer Peder Erichsen. At this point, it was the only privately owned building in Copenhagen whose facade featured a clock. The old No. 208A was listed in the new cadastre of 1806 as No. 188 in St. Ann's East Quarter. No. 188 and No. 1899 (old No. 208 B) were both owned by court master (hofmester) Johan Ludvig von Brochenhuus at this time. He was already the owner of at least one of the properties at the time of the 1801 census. His father Henrich Adam Brockenhuus resided in the other building .

No. 208 D (1806: No. 277) belonged to merchant (grosserer) Peter Erichsen (1754–1804) at the time of the 1801 census. He lived there with his wife Anne Agathe (Nancy, née Applebye). The property was from 1803 to 1810 owned by the merchant John Christmas. He sold the Barchmann Mansion at Frederiksholms Kanal in 1804 and purchased the property at Store Kongensgade 62 in 1810.

The shipbroking firm N. Schiøtt & Hochbrandt was based at Dronningens Tværgade 1-3 from 1820–46. It then moved to new premises at No. 10.

=== Hotel Stadt Hamburg ===
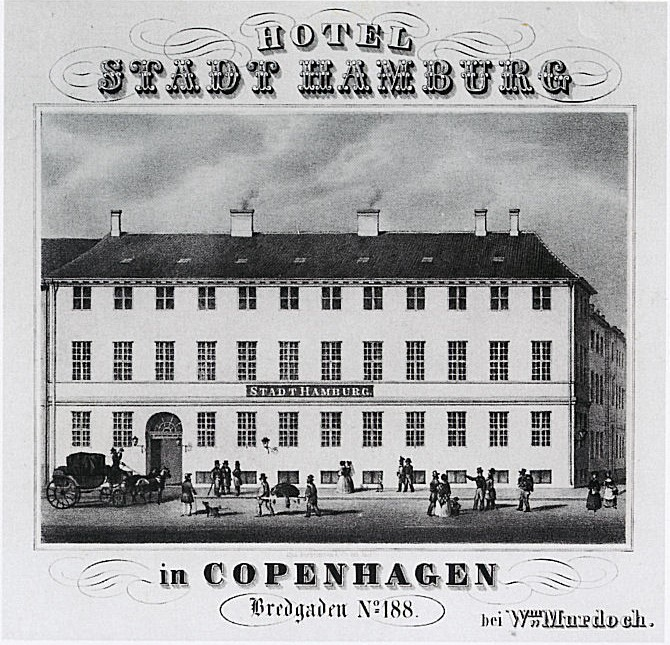
Advertisement for Stadt Hamburg from c. 1838

In 1837, No. 188 was acquired by restaurateur and hotelier William Murdoch (1785–1850). He was the son of Scottish engineer and inventor William Murdoch. He had started his career in Denmark as a machinist on the king's steamship and had later been the proprietor of Stadet Lauenburg in Store Strandstræde. He heightened the building with a low third storey and converted the building into a hotel under the name Hotel Stadt Hamburg.

Murdoch's property was home to 25 residents in two households at the 1840 census. William Murdoch resided on the ground floor with his wife Hanne Sophie (née Clasen), their eight children (aged two to 18), the German artist Johann Heinrich Wittmaack, two male servants and six maids. Hans Rasmussen, a concierge, resided in the basement with his wife Christiane Lovise Petersen, their three children (aged one to six) and one maid.

No. 277 was home to 16 residents in three households at the 1840 census. Joh. Pet. Kulander, another hotelier, resided on the first floor with his wife Anna Cathrine Niske, two young unmarried women, two male servants and three maids. Louis Urban Jürgensen, an astronomical clock maker, resided on the second floor with his wife Annette Horstmann, their three-year-old son Urban August Jürgensen, one male servant and one maid. Henriette Petersen (née Zinck), a widow, resided on the same floor with her daughter Susanne Petersen.

=== Hotel Phoenix opens ===
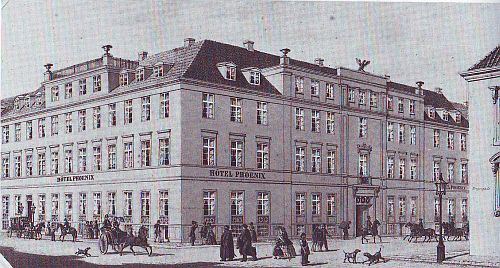
Hotel Phoenix in c. 1860

In 1847 No. 177 and No. 277 were both acquired by an aktieselskab and merged into a single property (referred to as No. 188 & 277). The old buildings were subsequently demolished and Hotel Phønix opened in a new building in 1848. The hotel was frequently used for housing guests of the nobility as well as the royal family.

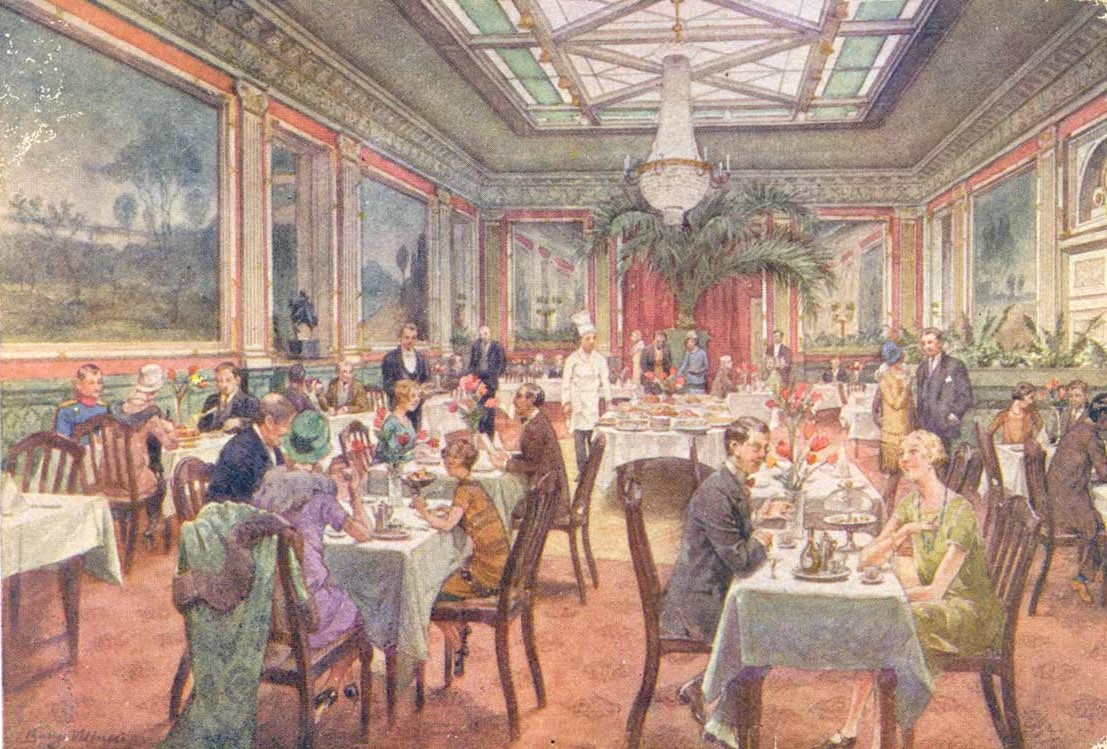
The Cavellier Hall in Hotel Phoenix, c. 1900

The hotel was privately owned from 1883 to 1919. In 1891, Carl Neiiendam bought the hotel from the grocer Christopher Emil Sødring. He was appointed to Royal Court Hotelier after the hotel had been used for housing some of the guests for King Christian IX and Queen Louise's fold wedding in 1892. Carl Neiiendam sold the hotel in 1917.

From 1919 to 1939, it hosted the legation of the Second Polish Republic to Denmark.

=== Closure and reopening ===
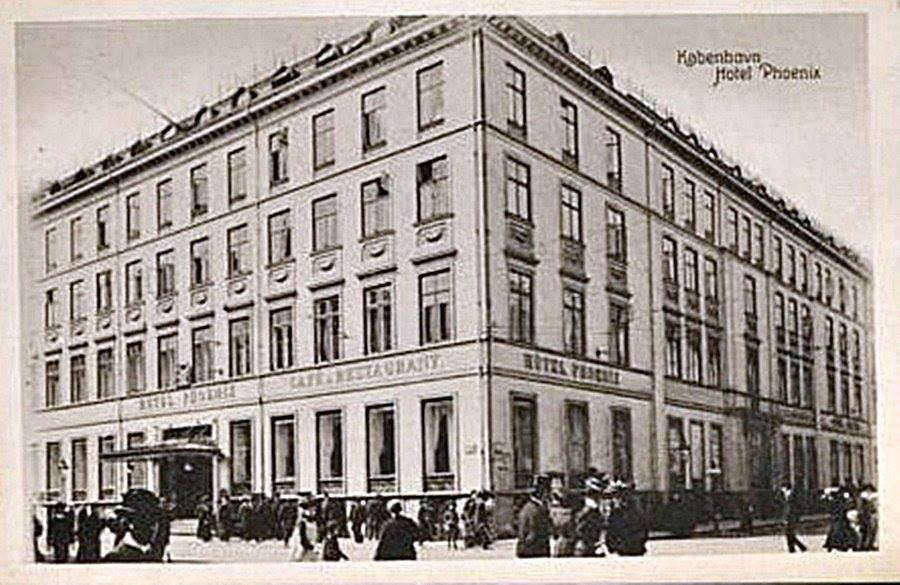
The hotel in c. 1900

Hotel Phoenix was confiscated by the occupying German forces during World War II. The building was used as the local headquarters for the German Navy.

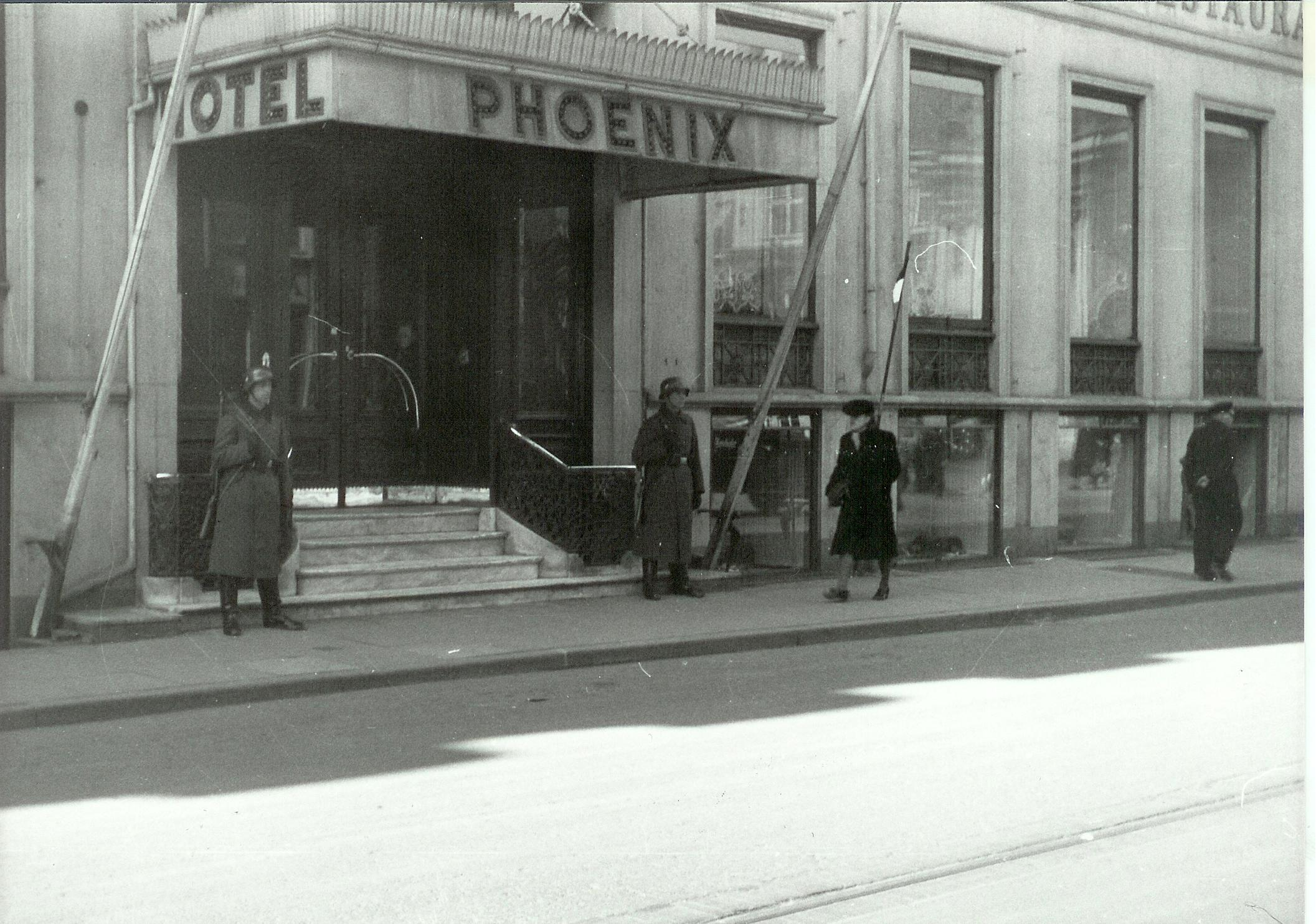
German soldiers on guard at the entrance to the confiscated hotel in 1945

In October 1945, a few months after the liberation, Hotel Phoenix was acquired by the Danish Communist Party. Ole Buhl and Harald Petersen were commissioned to adapt the building for its new use as party headquarters in 1946. The party's newspaper Land og Folk and several other associated activities were also based in the building.

Arp-Hansen acquired the building in 1990. The architect Robert Grünberger refurbished the hotel in 1990–1991.

== Cultural references ==
In Jules Verne's Journey to the Center of the Earth, Professor Lidenbroch and Axel stay at Hotel Phenix when they pass through Copenhagen on their way to Iceland.

== List of owners ==
- 17??-1749 Jean Henri Huguetan Gyldensteen
- 1749–1778 Jean Henri Desmercières
- Peder Erichsen
- 1837–1847 W. Murdoch
- 1847–1883 Limited company for the establishment of a hotel
- 1883–1919 Private owners
- 1945–1991 Communist Party of Denmark
- 1991–present Hotel Phoenix Copenhagen
