= Dronningens Tværgade 7 =

Building in Copenhagen

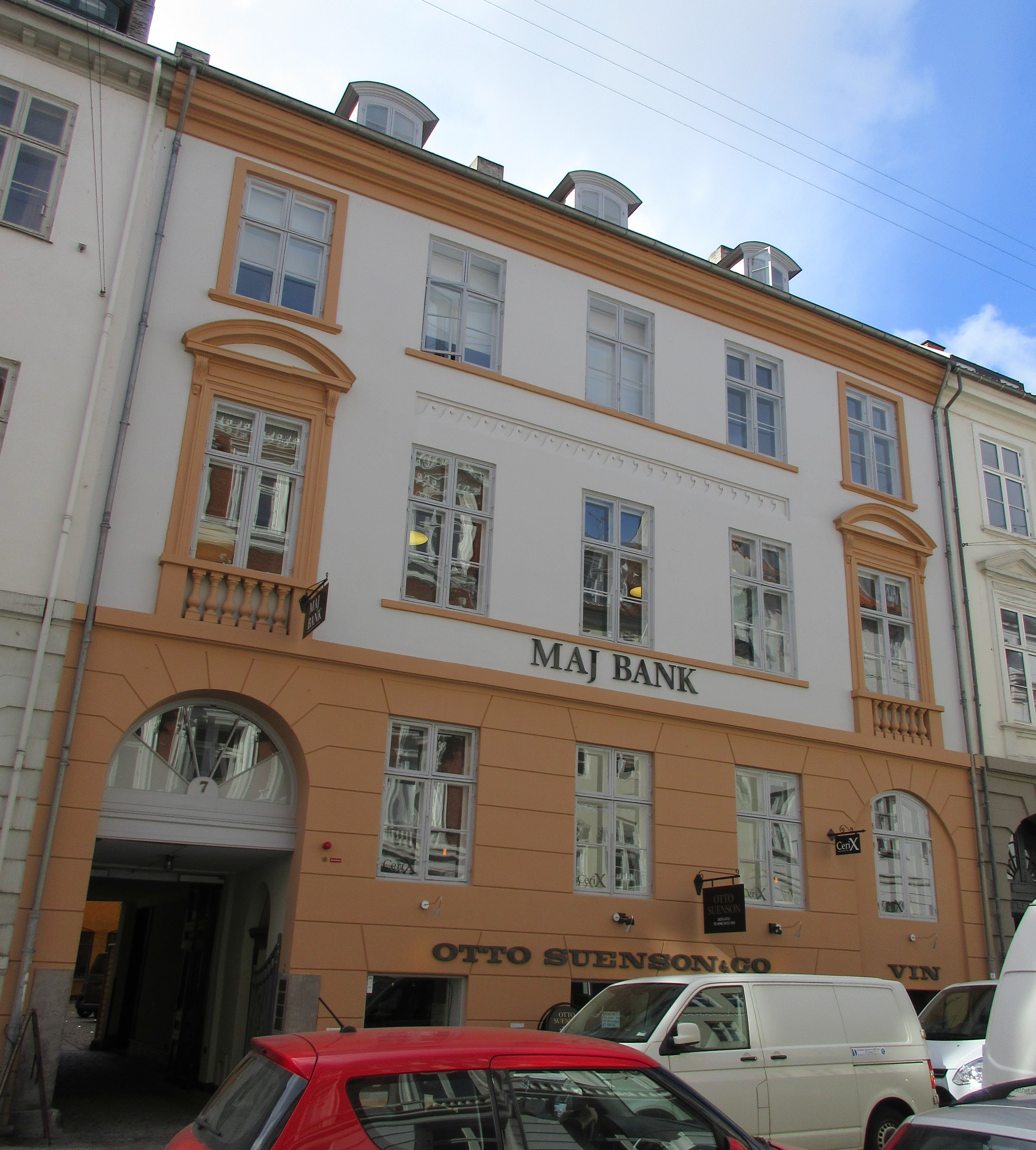
- Interactive map of the Dronningens Tværgade 7 area

General information
- Architectural style: Neoclassical
- Location: Copenhagen, Denmark
- Coordinates: 55°41′0.02″N 12°35′15.97″E
- Completed: 1783/1788

Dronningens Tværgade 7 is a Neoclassical property situated opposite Moltke's Mansion in central Copenhagen, Denmark. The building was from 1824 to 1867 home to the Royal Art Museum (Danish: Det Kongelige Kunstmuseum), a precursor of the National Museum. The wine dealer Otto Suenson & Co. was founded in the building on 24 May 1880 and still operates a wine shop in the basement. The building was listed in the Danish registry of protected buildings and places in 1999.

== History ==
=== Construction ===
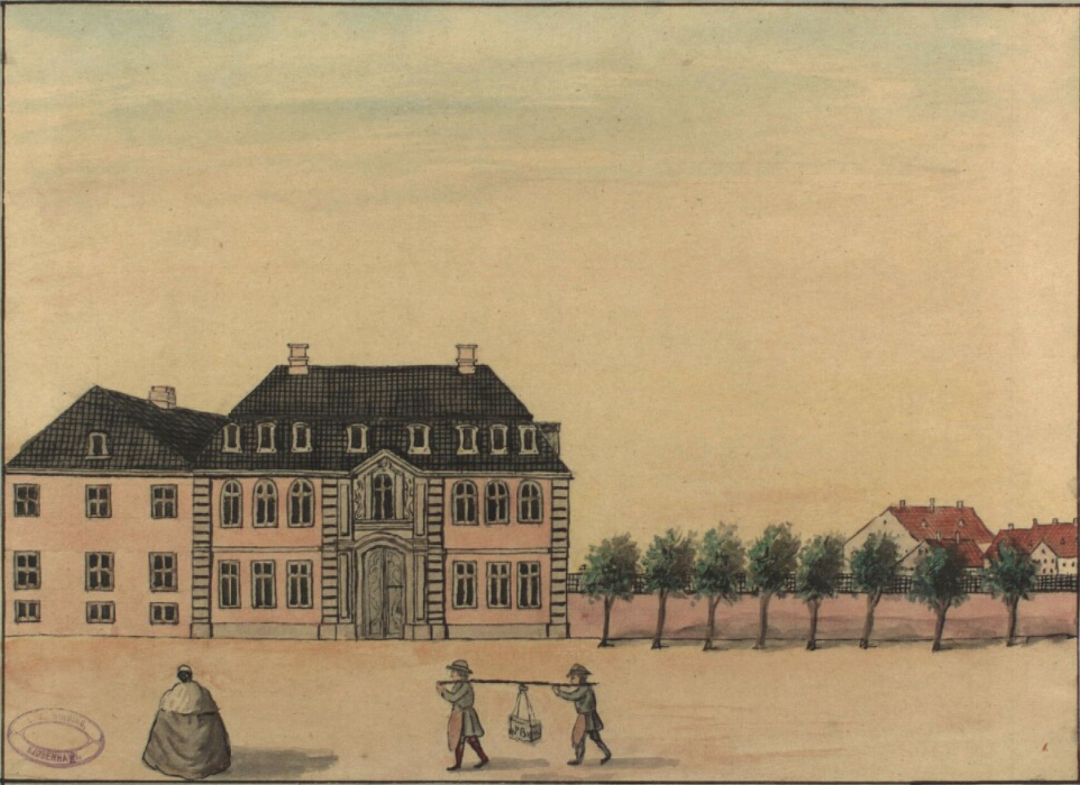
The Gyldensten Mansion in Dronningens Tværgade painted by Rach and Eegberg in c. 1750

The site was originally part of the extensive garden of the Gyldensten Mansion which reached all the way from Bredgade to Store Kongensgade along the south side of Dronningens Tværgade. The house was named after Jean Henri Huguetan, Count Gyldensteen.

In 1793, part of the garden was divided into three long, narrow lots and sold off for redevelopment. Dronningens Tværgade 7 (then No. 274) was together with No. 5 and No. 9 built in 1794 by the master builders Hans Ondrup (1751-1814) and A. Giedde (????).

=== Thomas Ter-Borch and Israel Suell ===
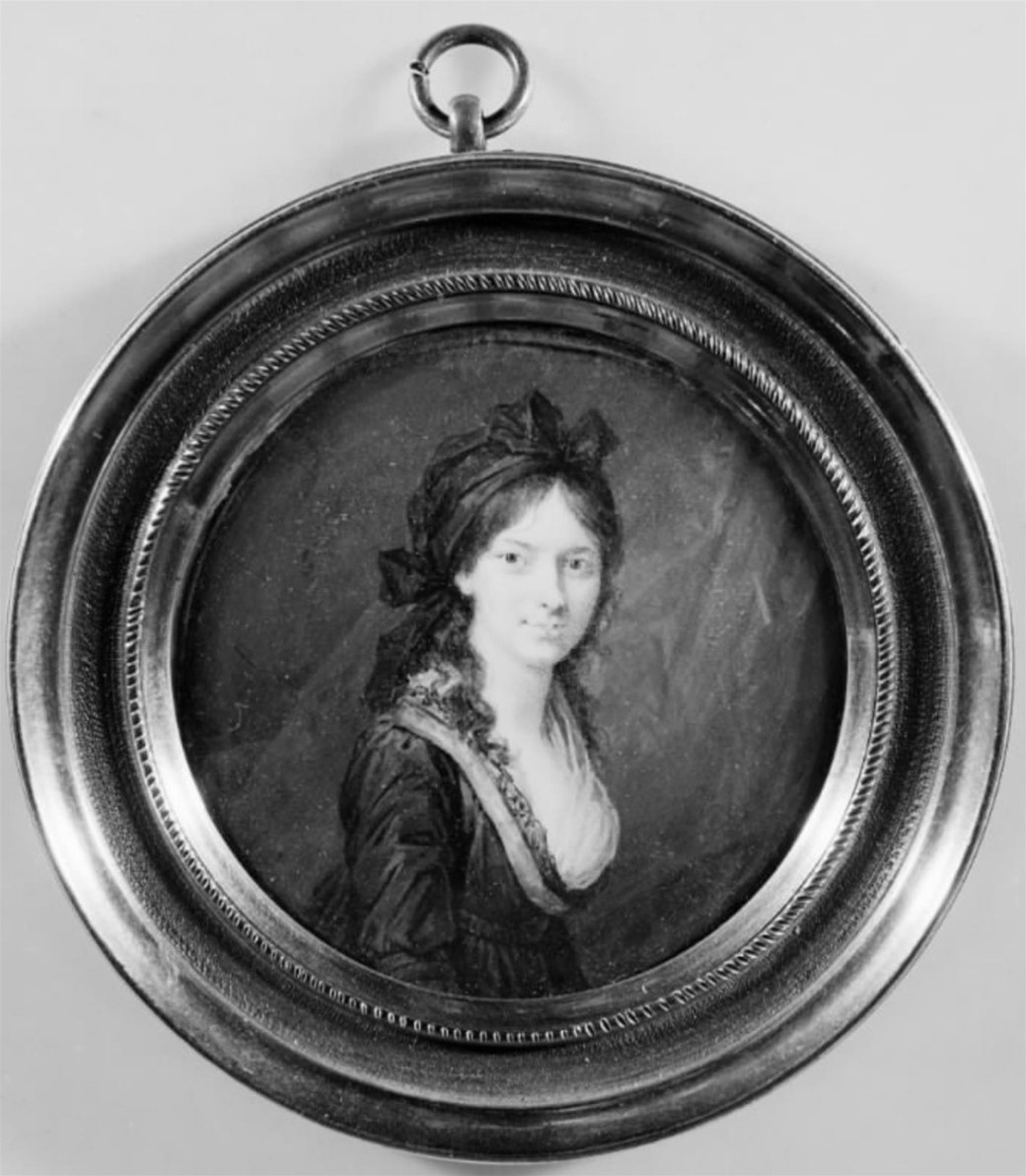
Anna Elisabeth Ter Borch by Cornelius Høyerm c. 1802.

The property was in 1800 acquired by the merchant Thomas Ter-Borch (1762-1812). He was born in Amsterdam. His parents moved the family to Saint Croix in the Danish West Indies in the 1770s. In 1784, they moved to Copenhagen where they lived in a now demolished building in Amaliegade (No. 36).

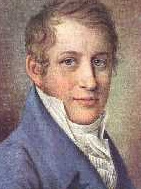
Israel Suell

Thomas Ter-Borch was married to two daughters of Major-General Johan Friedrich Heinrich (1730-1808) and Birgitte Lexmond (1738-1811). First Johanne Henriette Heinrich, and after her death, Anna Elisabeth Heinrich. His father-in-law was director of the Danish West India Company. The Ter-Borch family's staff consisted of a coachman, servant and two maids.

Ter-Borch's trading firm, Christmas, Ter Broch & Co., formerly Selbye & Ter Borch, was also based in the building. Ter Borch's business partner, John Christmas (1753–1822), who was originally from Bideford, Devonshire, had come to Copenhagen in 1790. He was married to another of the Heinrich sisters, Johanne Maria Heinrich.

Anna Elisabeth Heinrich was, following Ter-Borch's death in 1812, married for the second time to Israel Suell (1782-1860). He was originally from Malmö, Sweden. He continued the firm under the name Ter-Borch, Suell & Co. but went bankrupt in 1819 and then returned to Malmö.

=== The Royal Collections, 1822–1867 ===
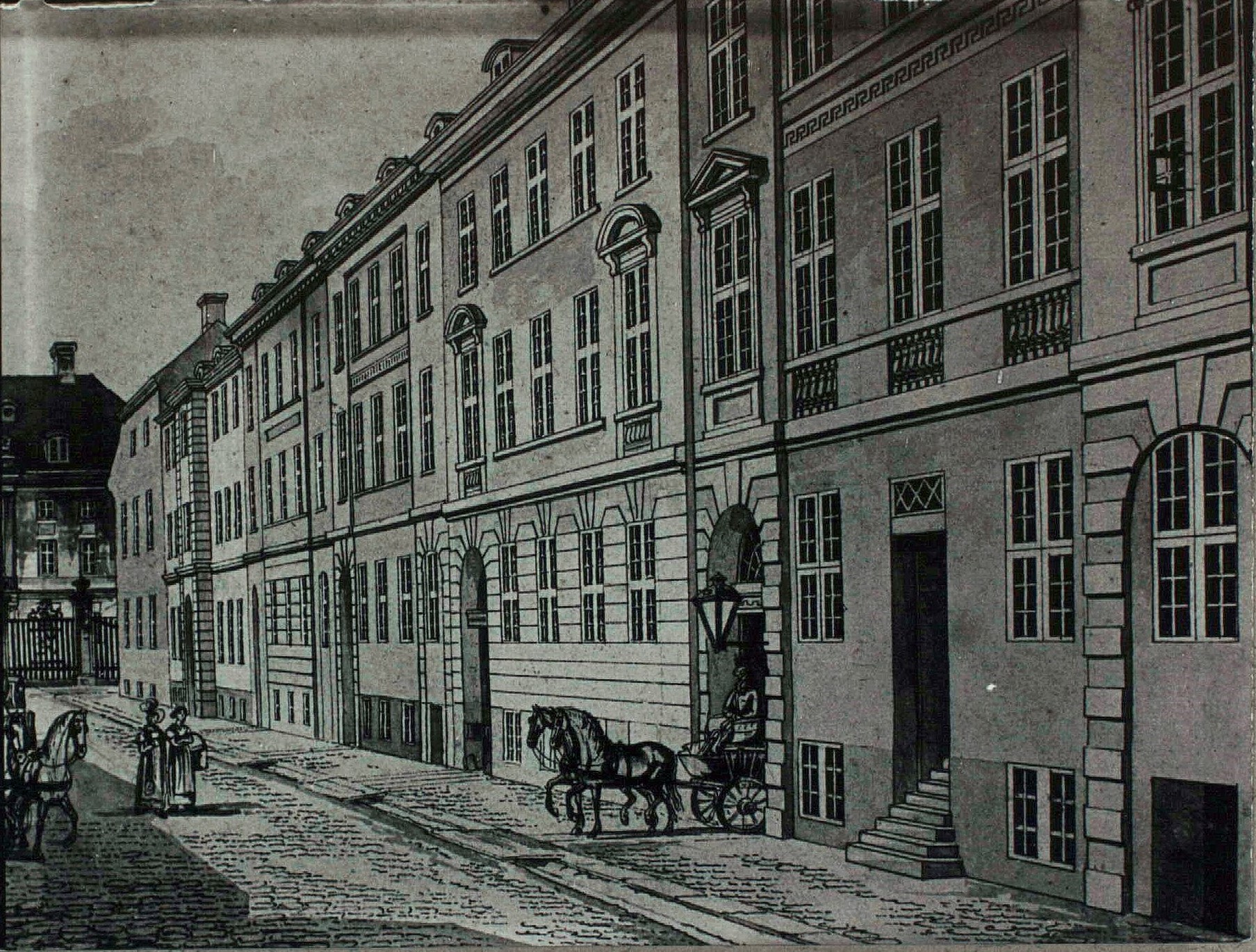
Dronningens Tværgade 1–9, 1825

On 29 October 1822, Dronningens Tværgade 7 (then No. 274) was sold in public auction to the Rentekammeret for 31,720 rigsdaler. By royal resolution of 3 February 1821, it had been decided to move the Kunstkammer out of the Royal Danish Library on Slotsholmen and split the collections. The building in Dronningens Tværgade was acquired for use as a new home for the royal collections of historical artifacts. The royal painting collection was transferred to Christiansborg Palace and the natural history collections were transferred to the Holstein Mansion. The Ancient Nordic Collection (Oldnordisk Samling) had already for some time been based in the Library Loft above Trinitatis Church.

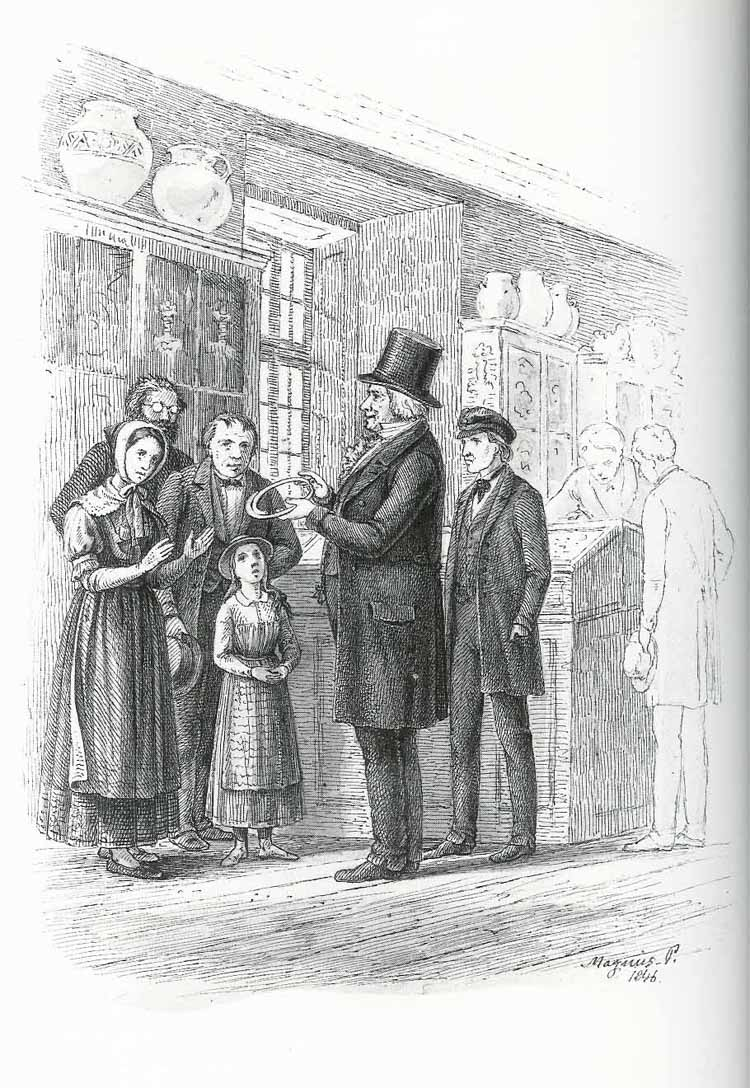
Christian Jürgensen Thomsen showing visitors around in the museum, 1848

The plan for the building in Dronningens Tværgade was confirmed by royal resolution of 26 April 1823 and the move was completed in 1824–25. Kunstkammeret was officially dissolved by royal resolution of 27 May 1825. Johan Conrad Spengler was appointed as director of both the Royal Painting Gallery at Christiansborg and the Royal Art Museum (Danish: Det Kongelige Kunstmuseum) as the institution in Dronningens Tværgade was now called. The collections covered the area cultural history, Ancient Greece and Ancient Rome, etnographica, decorative arts and the Middle Ages. The building was decommissioned when the royal collection of historical artifacts was transferred to the Prince's Mansion in 1867.

In 1839, Christian Jürgensen Thomsen succeeded Spengler as inspector of the museum. He resided in an apartment in the building from 1840 to 1850. In 1851, he moved to a new residence in the Prince's Mansion after being appointed as inspector of the new Museum of Nordic Antiquities as well as the Royal Coin and Medal Collection. Carl Ferdinand Allen, professor of history at the University of Copenhagen, was a resident in the building from 1852 to 1861. C. E. Dockum (1804-1893), a naval officer, resided in another apartment from 1853 to 1857. The politician and economist C. N. David (1793-1874) resided in the building from 1862.

=== Later history ===
The property was later owned by the businessman (grosserer) Carl Jens Rerup (1831-1905). It was after his death owned by his daughter Wilhelmine Rerup. In 1886, she had become the first female member of Grosserer-Societetet.

The writer, publisher and politician Edvard Brandes (1847-1931) resided in the building from 1888 to 1892.

Otto Suenson, a former mariner in the Royal Danish Navy, opened a wine shop in the basement in 1880. V. Aa. Preben-Andersen (1906-1946) becamer a partner in Otto Suenson & Co. in 1931 and continued it alone when Suenson died later the same year. The firm was later continued by his son.

== Architecture ==
Dronningens Tværgade 7 consists of three storeys over a raised cellar and is five bays wide. The ground storey has rusticated finishing. The windows in the outer bays of the beletage have sandstone frames, balluster decorations and are topped by pediments. A decorative frieze is seen over the three central windows of the same storey. The gate in the left-hand side of the building is topped by a fanlight.

== Today ==
Dronningens Tværgade 7 is today owned by Keudan. Maj Bank is based in the building. Otto Suenson still operates a wine shop in the basement.

== Gallery ==
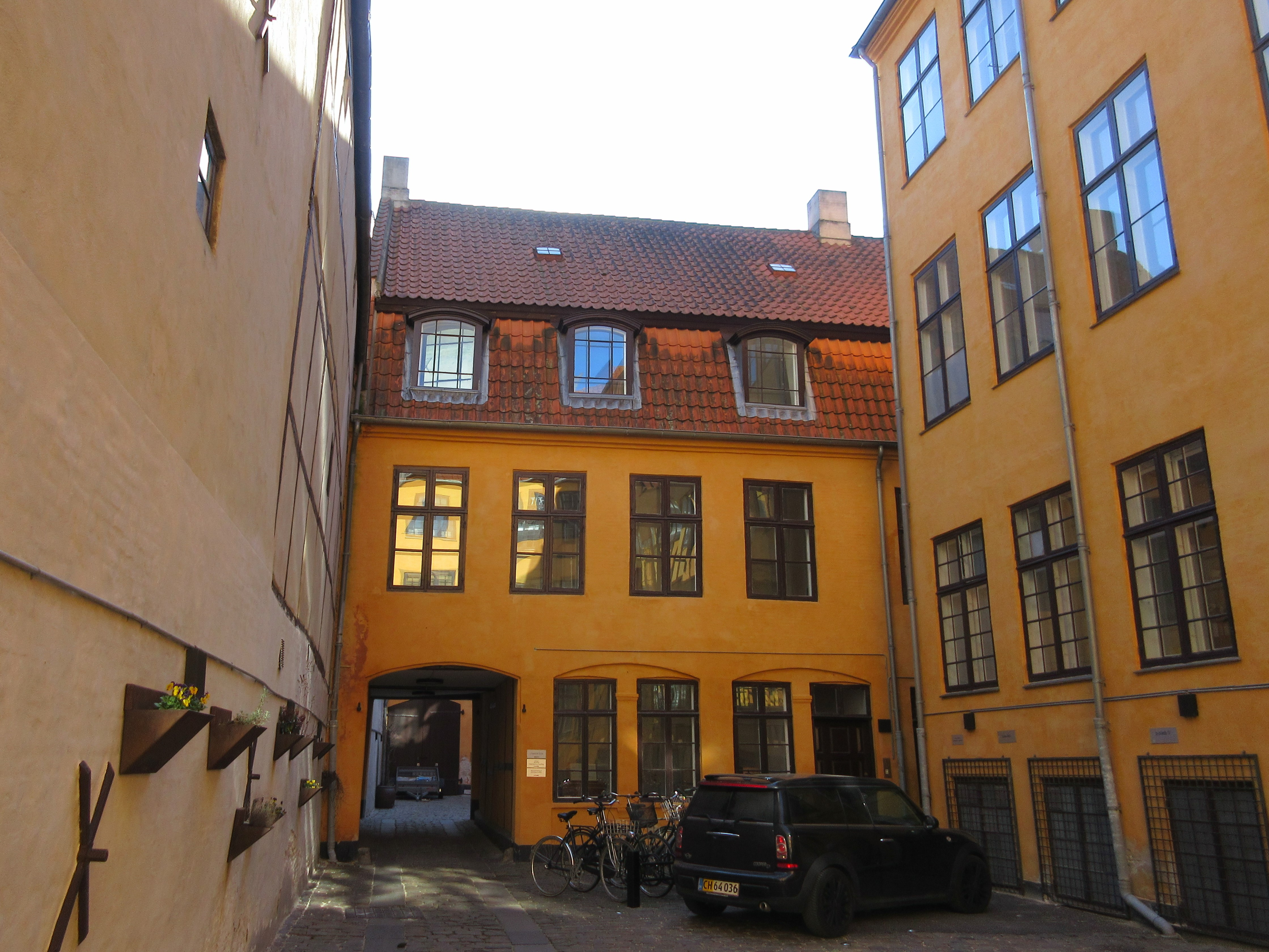
The building separating the first and second courtyard

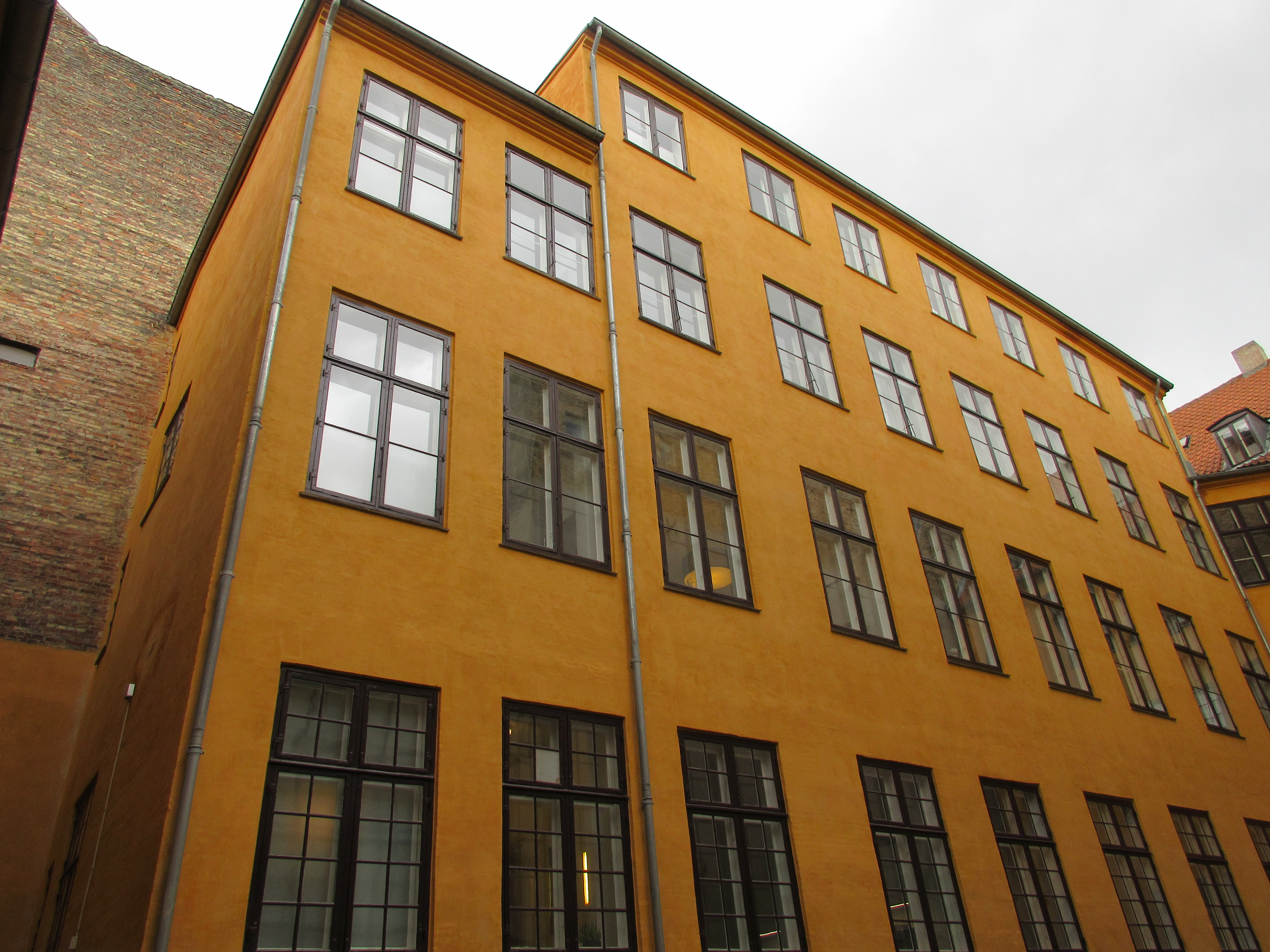
The side wing

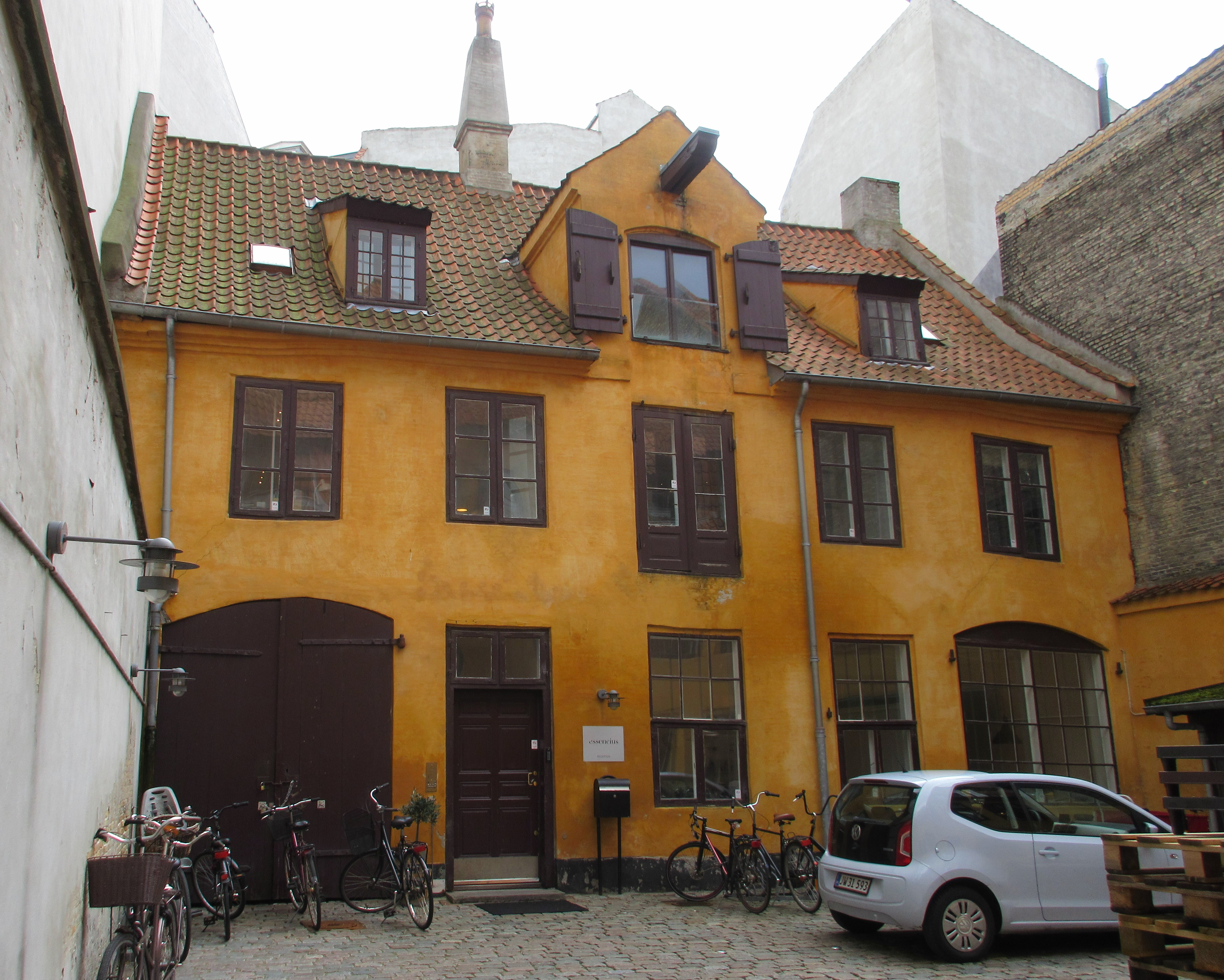
No. 7B. The rear wing
