= List of hotels: Countries D =

This is a list of what are intended to be the notable top hotels by country, five or four star hotels, notable skyscraper landmarks or historic hotels which are covered in multiple reliable publications. It should not be a directory of every hotel in every country:

== Denmark ==
- 71 Nyhavn, Copenhagen
- Asserbohus
- Bella Center, Copenhagen
- Bernstorff Palace, Copenhagen
- Brøndums Hotel, Skagen
- Copenhagen Admiral Hotel, Copenhagen
- DGI-byen, Copenhagen
- Dragsholm Castle, Dragsholm
- Dronninglund Hotel, Dronninglund
- Hotel Astoriam Copenhagen
- Hotel Bristol, Copenhagen
- Hotel D'Angleterre, Copenhagen
- Hvedholm Castle, Faaborg
- Nimb Hotel, Copenhagen
- Radisson Blu Royal Hotel, Copenhagen, Copenhagen
- Radisson SAS HC Andersen Hotel, Odense
- Ruth's Hotel, Skagen
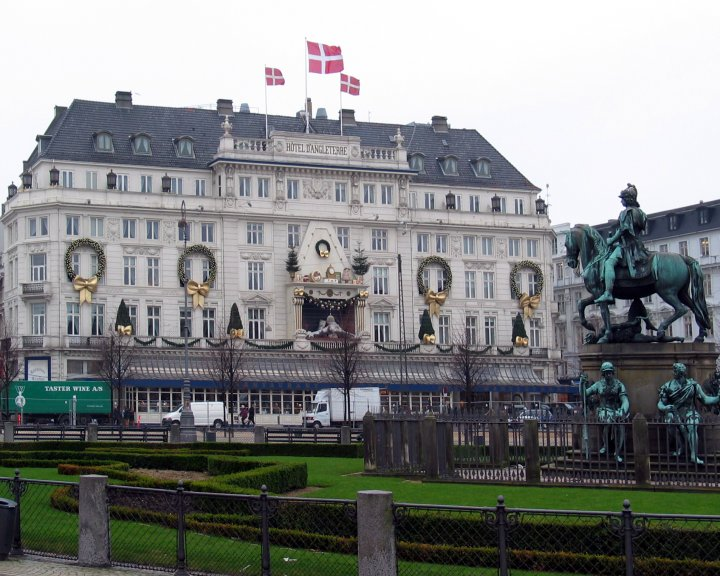
Hotel D'Angleterre

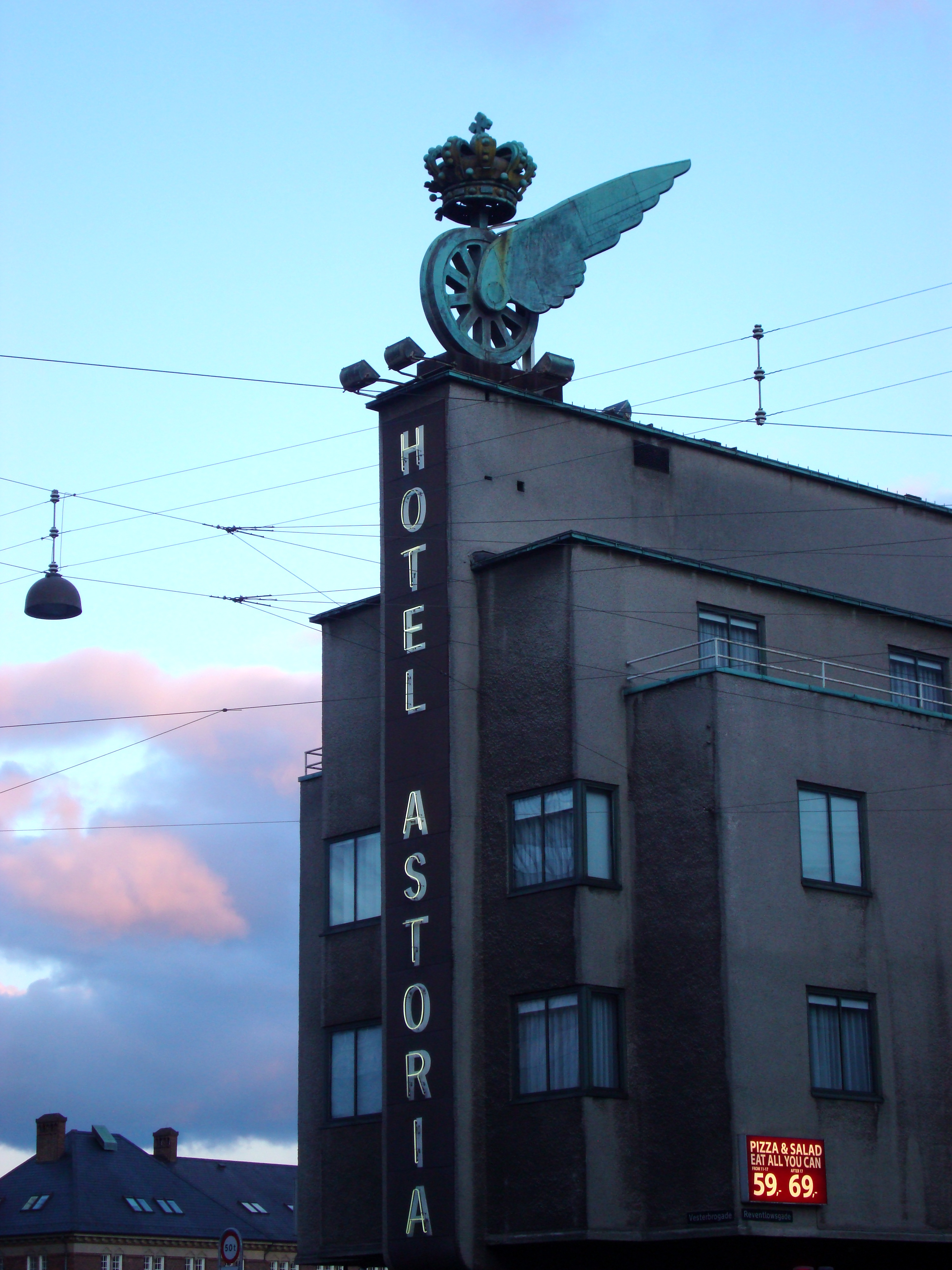
Hotel Astoria

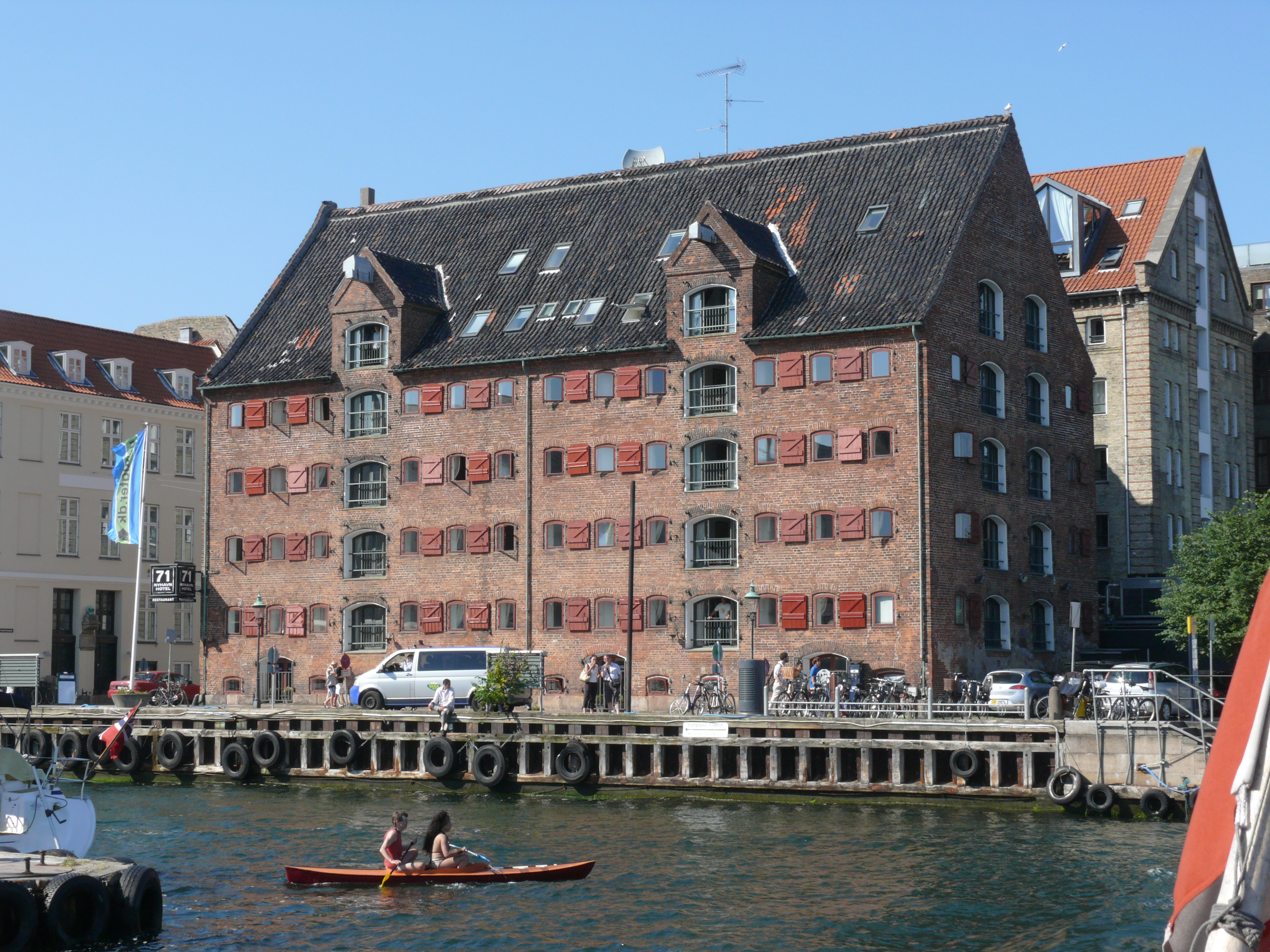
71 Nyhavn

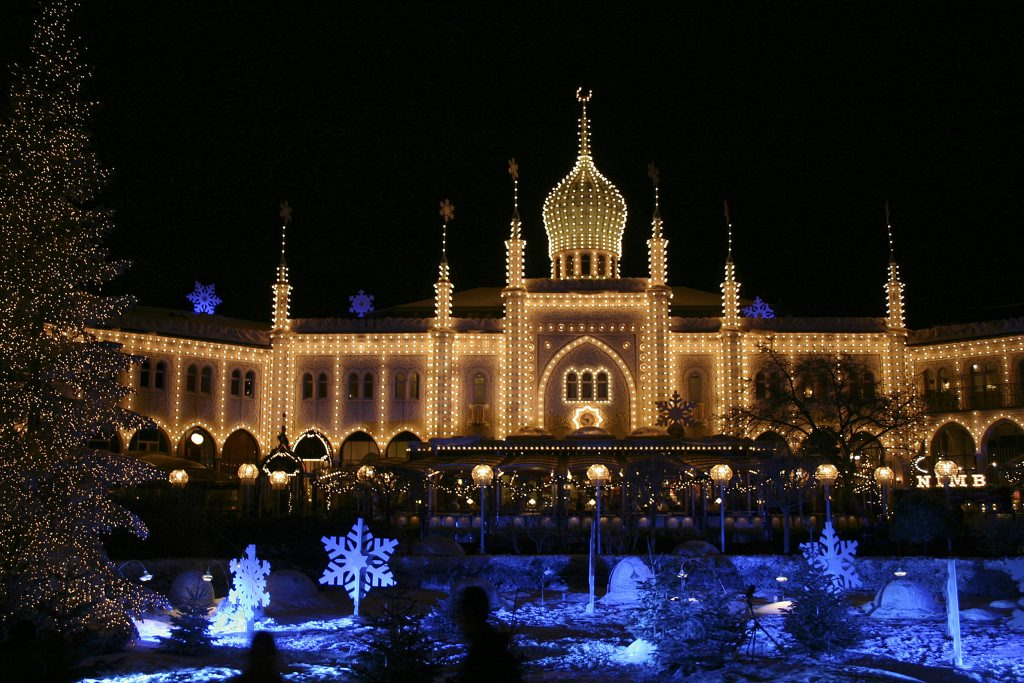
Nimb Hotel

== Dominica ==
- Evergreen Hotel, Roseau
- Fort Young Hotel, Roseau
- Garraway Hotel, Roseau

== Dominican Republic ==
- Barceló Bávaro Palace Deluxe, Punta Cana
- EdenH Real Arena Hotel, Punta Cana
- Puntacana Resort and Club, Punta Cana
