= Halling =

Halling may refer to:

- Halling (dance), a dance, mainly Norwegian
- Halling (horse) (born 1991), Thoroughbred racehorse
- Halling (person), a person from Hallingdal, Norway
- Halling (surname)
- Halling, character in Stargate Atlantis, List of Stargate Atlantis characters#Athosians

== People ==
- William Halling, a Danish nabob and landowner

== Places ==
- Halling, Kent, a village in England
- Halling-lès-Boulay, a village in Moselle Department, France
- Halling, Moselle a locality of Puttelange-lès-Thionville, Moselle
- Halling railway station, a railway station in the southeastern United Kingdom, on the Medway Valley Line
