= The Museums in Brønderslev Municipality =

Parent organisation of three museums in Denmark

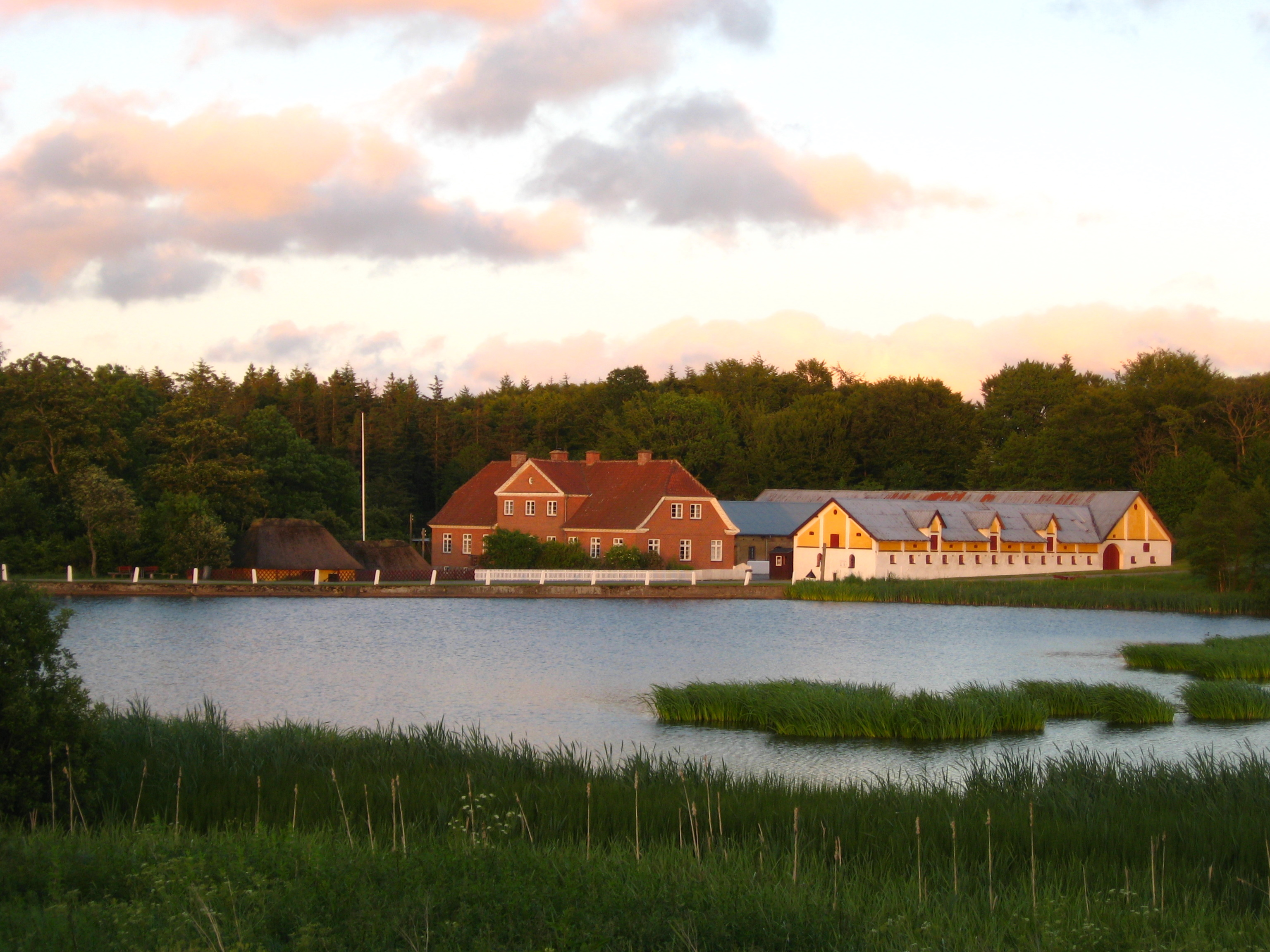
Dorf Møllegård and the Mill-lake, one of the three museums of The Museums in Brønderlev Municipality.

The Museums in Brønderslev Municipality (Danish: Museerne i Brønderslev Kommune) is the umbrella organization for three State-recognized museums in the Municipality of Brønderslev in Denmark.

The three museums are:

== Try Museum ==
Try Museum is located at Dronninglund and was founded in 1929 and was originally based on the private collections of Jørgen Nørgård, who left it when he died in 1927. The principal of Try højskole Frode Fogt and a former student named P. Christensen was the main force behind the creation of the museum, and P. Christensen became the first manager. A half-timbered house inspired by a former clock-and-watchmakers house from Ørsø was erected and used for displaying the collections of antiquities, domestic utensils, various weapons, etc.. Nowadays, the old farmhouse of 'Lille Knudsgård' with associated stables and the old watermill of Østermølle (from the 1500s) near Dronninglund Castle, is also a part of Try Museum. The museum is concentrating on displaying the cultural history and daily life of the common rural farmers in the region.

== Dorf Møllegård ==
Dorf Møllegård (English: Dorf Mill-farm) is located at the small village of Dorf, roughly 8 km north of Dronninglund. The buildings was bought and the museum initiated by Try Museum in 1997, as a museum for hunting and forestry in the region of Vendsyssel. The museum is situated in an old mill-farm with its associated windmill from the 1800s and a watermill from the 1600s. the Mill-farm was in operation until 1952 and is one of the only preserved mill-farms in Denmark.

The first floor of the residence quarters a toy- and puppet theatre museum. Puppet theatre became popular in the 1700s in Denmark and the beginning of the 1800s saw the introduction of toy- theatres.

A nature-path is laid out in the immediate surroundings of Dorf Møllegård and the whole area have been protected by law.

== Vildmosemuseet ==
Vildmosemuseet from 1984, is situated in the town of Brønderslev and resides in the old abandoned farmhouse of 'Paukjærgård'. The museum is concentrating on the cultural history of the local region and the bog of Store Vildmose in particular. It joined The Museums in Brønderslev Municipality in 2012.

== Source and external link ==
- Museerne i Brønderslev Kommune Official homepage (in Danish)
