= Brigadér Halling House =

Building in Copenhagen, Denmark

- Brigadér Halling's Gård
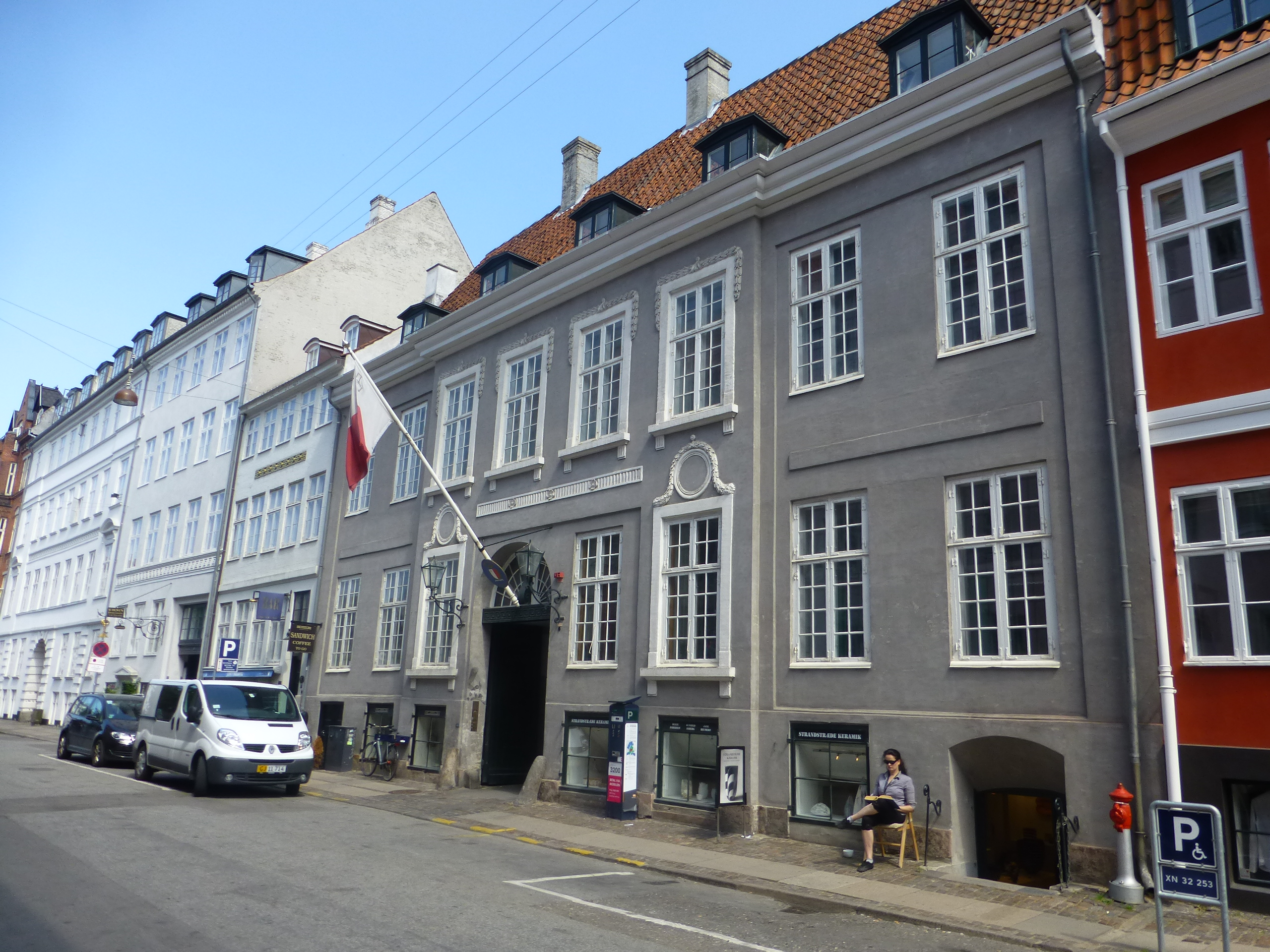
- Interactive map of the Brigadér Halling House area

General information
- Architectural style: Hans Næss
- Location: Copenhagen, Denmark
- Coordinates: 55°40′51.23″N 12°35′23.67″E
- Construction started: 1773
- Completed: 1776

The Brigadér Halling House is a listed property at Lille Strandstræde 14 in central Copenhagen, Denmark. It takes its name from William Halling, a Dane who acquired the building shortly after returning to Denmark from India where he had served in the British army. He was known as Brigadér Halling (Brigadér von Halling) after he acquired the title Brigadér in 1872. The building now houses the Maltese embassy.

== History ==
=== 18th century ===
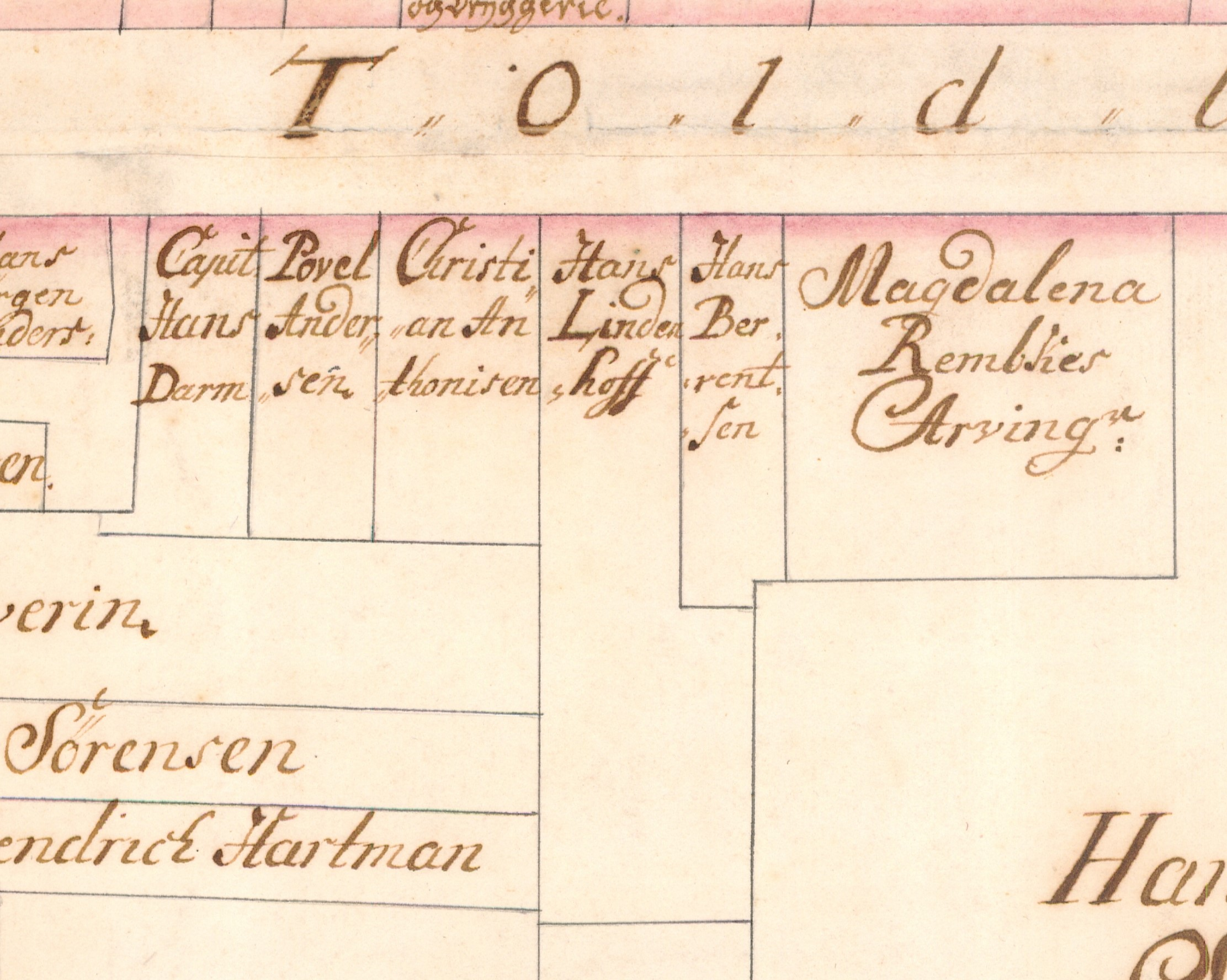
Seidelin's property seen in a detail from a plan of the area from 1731

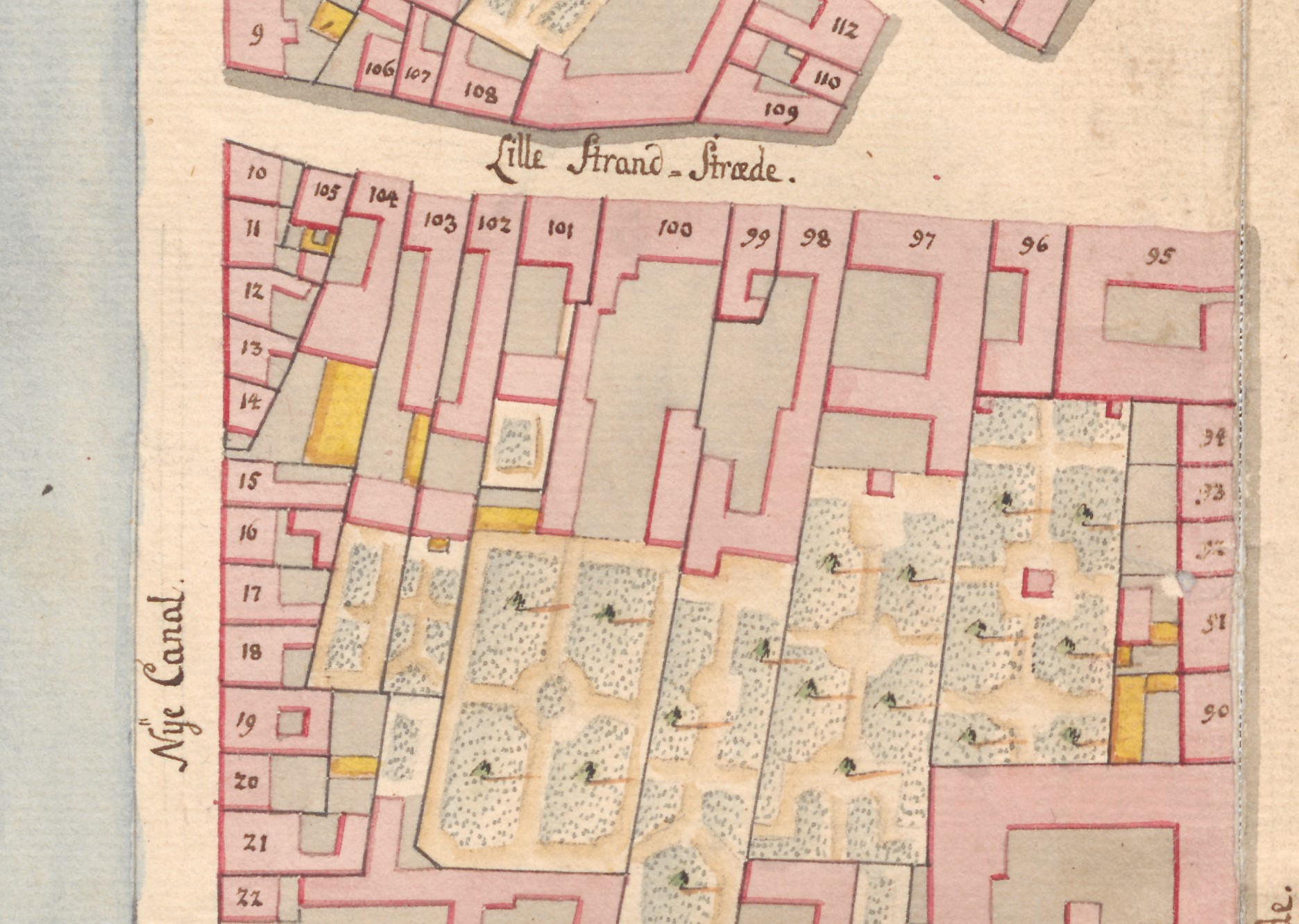
No. 100 seen in a detail from Christian Gedde's map of St. Ann's East Quarter, 1757

The property was part of a much larger property in the late 17th century. It was listed as No. 28 in St. Ann's East Quarter (Sankt Annæ Øster Kvarter) by 1689 and owned by Admiral Marcus Rodsten,

The property now known as Lille Strandstræde 14 was owned by Hans Seidelin from 1715. The current building was constructed in the 1730s. On Seidelin's death in 1752, the property was passed to his nephew Hans Diderik Brinck-Seidelin.

After just two years, Brinch-Seidelin sold the property to Vice Admiral Hans Henrik Rømeling (1707–1775). In the new cadastre of 1756, the property was listed as No. 100.

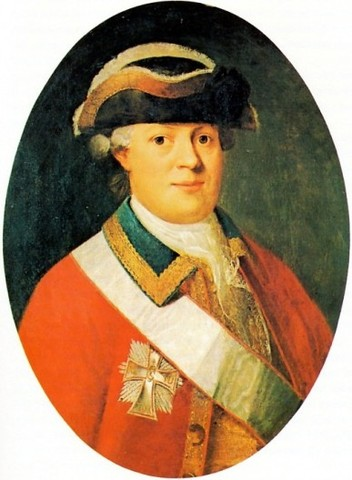
William Halling in 1776

The property was acquired in 1772 by William von Halling, who had just returned from India where he had been in British military service. He altered and expanded the building from 1773 to 1776. It is believed that the architect was Hans Næss, a student of Nicolas-Henri Jardin. In 1774, he married Christine Linde Hvas de Lindenpalm, the only daughter of Jørgen Hvas de Lindenpalm. He received the two estates Tirsbæk and Bryckesborg as dowry, renaming the latter Willamsborg. In 1776, he ceded Tirsbæk to count Caspar von Moltke in exchange for Dronninglund in Vendsyssel. Here he later constructed a large town mansion in Aalborg (now Hotel Phønic).

=== The brewery, 1777–1924 ===
On 17 June 1888, the property was acquired by brewer Jacob Christensen Koutrup. Koutrup had been the owner of a large brewery on Kongens Nytorv, but on 4 May 1776, just after midnight, it was destroyed by fire. A brewery worker was later sentenced to three years of forced labour for negligence.

73-year-old Koutrup established a new brewery in the yard of his new property. After his death less than one year later, the brewery was continued by his wife Johanne Koutrup.

At the time of the 1787 census, No. 100 was home to two households. Johanna Kantrup resided in the building with her daughter Inger Sophia Elisbeth, a maid, a female cook, three brewery workers and a coachman. Johannes Hendrick Mincke, a 33-year-old student, resided in another dwelling with his wife Ulrica Georgina, their one-year-old son Carl, a male servant, a caretaker, a maid, a wet nurse and a female cook.

In 1794, Jens Johansen Noor purchased the property.

At the time of the 1801 census, Noor resided in the building with his wife Sophie Magdalene Noor, their three children (aged one to ten), a maid, a wet nurse, a caretaker and two brewery workers. The brewery was managed by Erland Wolkwardtsen. Just Peter Meinertz, a broker (mægler), resided in the other apartment with his wife Maren Hansen, their three-year-old son Frederik Meinertz, a 17-year-old office clerk and a maid. Hans Nielsen Kellerman (1739–1807), a ship broker, resided in the building with his wife Margrethe née Teilman (1739-1801), two unmarried women (aged 18 and 59), a male servant, a maid and a female cook.

In the new cadastre of 1806, the property was listed as No. 68. It was still owned by Noor. The property was later the same year sold to Andreas Petersen. He was a merchant (grosserer) but continued the brewery.

=== Dr. Ryge's House, 1824–1850 ===
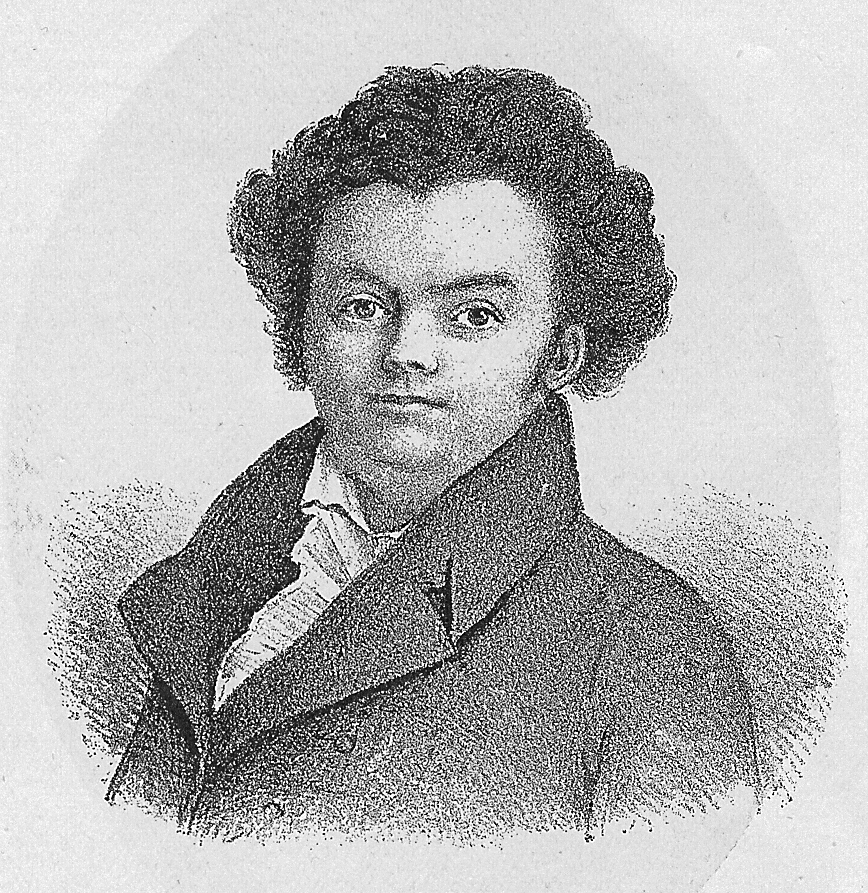
Johan Christian Ryge

The property was acquired by the Royal Danish Theatre in 1824. In 1832, the property in Lille Strandstræde became known as No. 68 A. This happened after a section of it was merged with a section of No. 66 to form No. 66 B & 68 B (from 1879 part of Nyhavn 31).

At the time of the 1834 census, No. 68 A was home to three households. Johann Christian Ryge, an actor at the Royal Danish Theatre, resided on the ground floor with his wife Charlotte Betzy née Anthon, their four children (aged one to seven), two children from Ryge's first marriage (aged 18 and 21) and two maids. Wilhelm Nielsen, a royal stableman (rideknægt), resided in another dwelling on the ground floor (den øverste Deel af Stuen paa) with his wife Catharine Marie née Ziegler. Hans Nicolai Soelberg, a coachman (hyrekusk), resided in a third dwelling on the ground floor together with two servants. Jens Jacob Ellebye, a royal workman (Kongelige Arbeidsmand paa Palaiet), resided in the basement with his wife Birthe Kirstine (née Rasmussen) and their 11-year-old daughter.

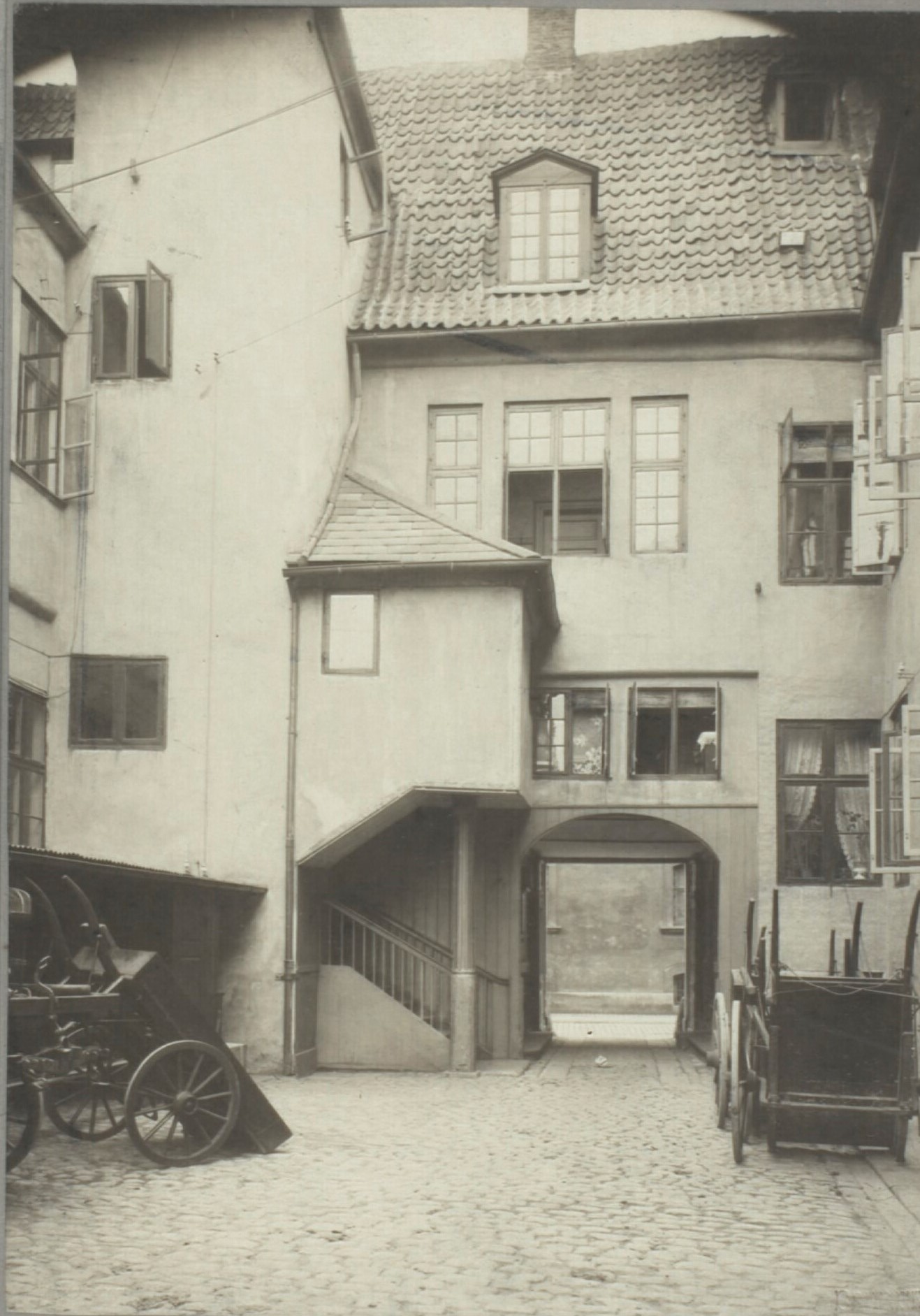
Courtyard of Lille Strandstræde 14

At the time of the 1840 census, No. 68 was home to a total of 30 residents. Ryge and his wife were still residing on the ground floor with their now eight children (aged three to 21) and two maids. Hans Nicolai Sodberg, the coachman, now married and with two children, was also still residing on the ground floor. Niels Nielsen Lund, the proprietor of a tavern in the basement, resided in the associated dwelling with his wife Anne Jensen, their six children (aged five to 13) and four lodgers. Gotthilf Ferdinand Lassen (1903–1860), a former inspector at the Royal Danish Theatre and a historical collector, resided with a maid on the first floor.

Charlotte Betry Ryge had become a widow by 1850. She was still residing in the ground floor apartment with five daughters (aged 13 to 23) and two maids. Niels Jørgen Jensen, an ironmonger, was now residing in the basement with his wife Maren Kirstine Kondrup, their one-year-old son and a lodger.

=== Hans Nicolai Soelberg, 1850–87 ===
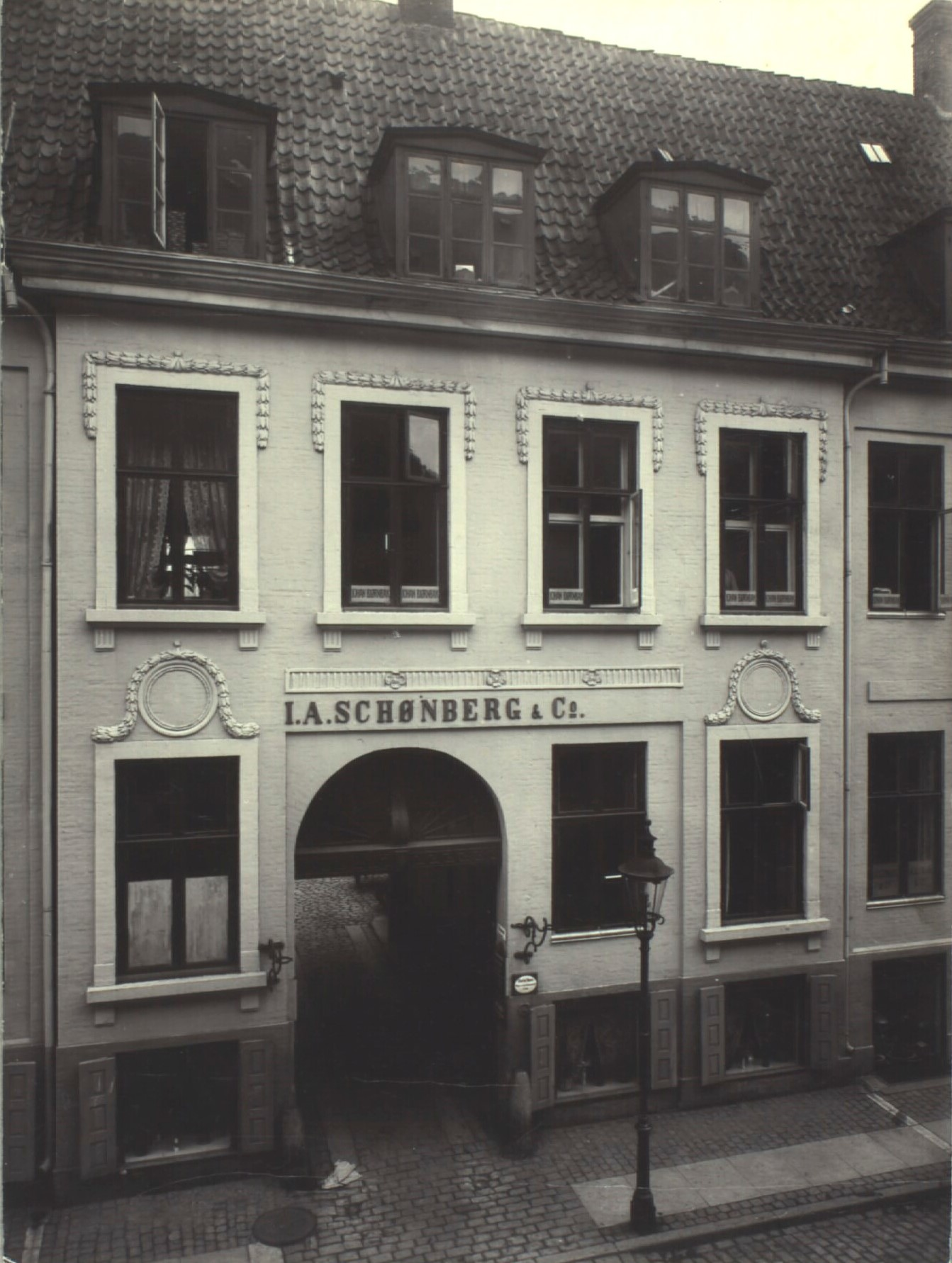
L. A. Schønberg & Co.

Hans Nicolai Soelberg, who had started a haulier's business by then, was able to buy the entire building in 1850.

The property was home to 35 residents at the 1880 census.

Hans Nicolai Soelberg, who had now retired, resided on the ground floor with his wife Vilhelmine Soelberg (née Nielsen) and their son Frits Holger Billenstein. Jac Cohn, a businessman, resided on the ground floor with his wife Line Cohn, their four sons (aged 19 to 26) and two maids. Niels Christian Aars, a manufacturer of cigars, resided on the first floor with his wife Adelgunde Aars (née Soelberg), one maid and one lodger. Søren Peter Jacobsen, a restaurateur (gæstgiver), resided in the basement with his wife Anna Eleonora Christine Frederikke Jacobsen. Niels Jørgen Jensen, an ironmonger, resided in the basement with his wife Maren Christine Jensen and two daughters (aged 21 and 23). Louise Mathilde Holm født Büch, a widow, resided on the second floor of the rear wing with her daughter Laura Aurora Holm, a 10-year-old grandson, one maid and one lodger. Johan Axel Christoffer Hermansen, a workman, resided on the second floor of the rear wing. Jens Peter Holm, a master tailor, resided on the second floor of the rear wing.

=== Later history ===
In 1887, H. C. Nyholm purchased the property. Just one year later he sold it to farmer F. Külerich. In 1890, it changed hands again when it was acquired by A. T. Linek.

In 1898, the property was acquired by J. A. Schiönberg & Co. and R. E. Hartvig. In 1902, J. A. Schiönberg & Co. became the sole owner of the property.

In 1908, Frank W. Nissler. He was the owner of C. Bogn & Co., a haullier's business at Købmagergade 26 with roots back to 779.

== Architecture ==
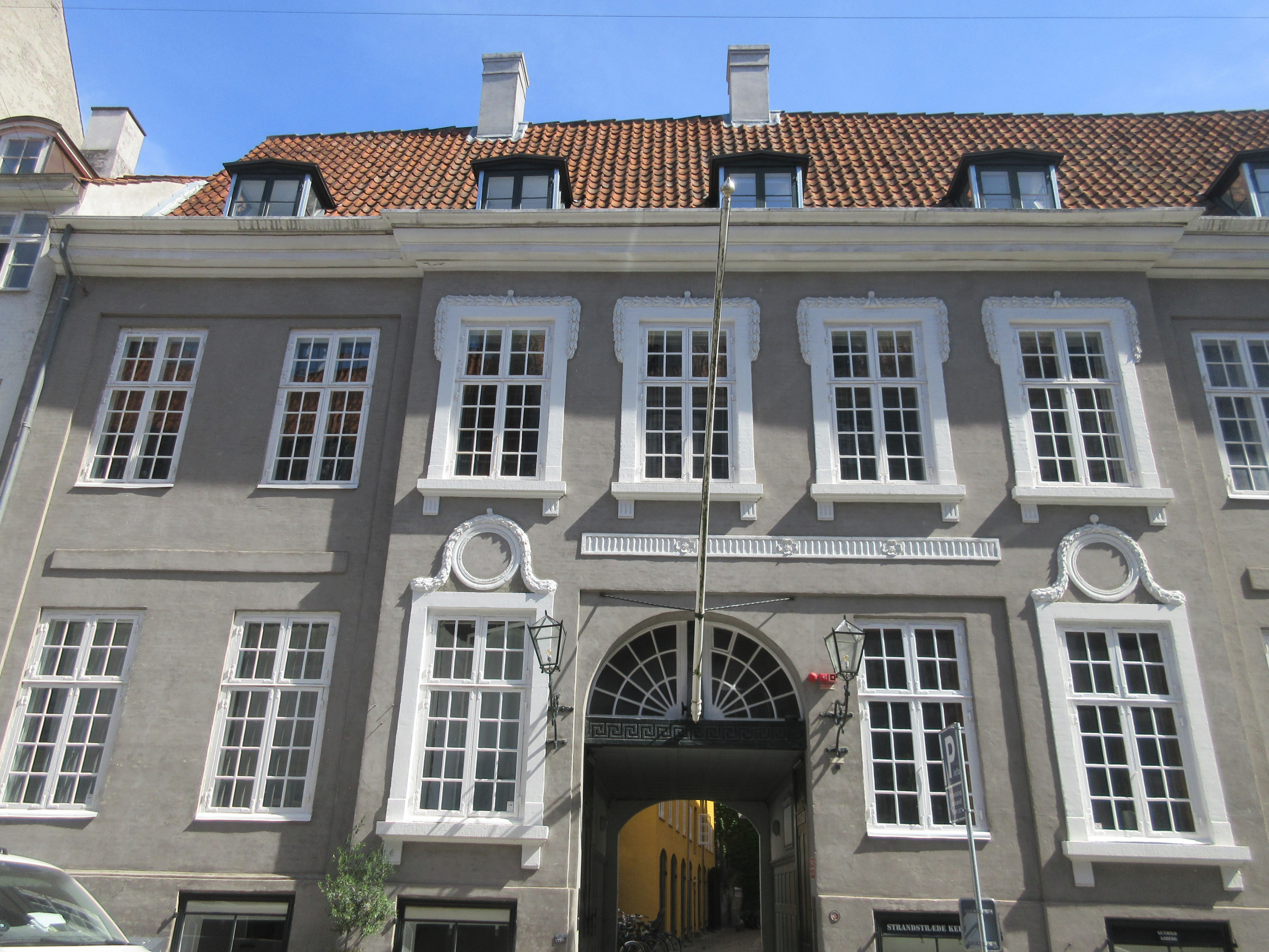
The asymmetrically placed gateway

The four-bay median risalit and decorations on the facade date from the expansion of the building in 1773–1776. The gate was not moved when the house was expanded and is therefore not placed in the centre of the building. This has been solved by placing the gate and an undecorated window in a slightly recessed portion of the median risalit.

== Today ==
The building now houses the Maltese embassy.

== Li of owners ==
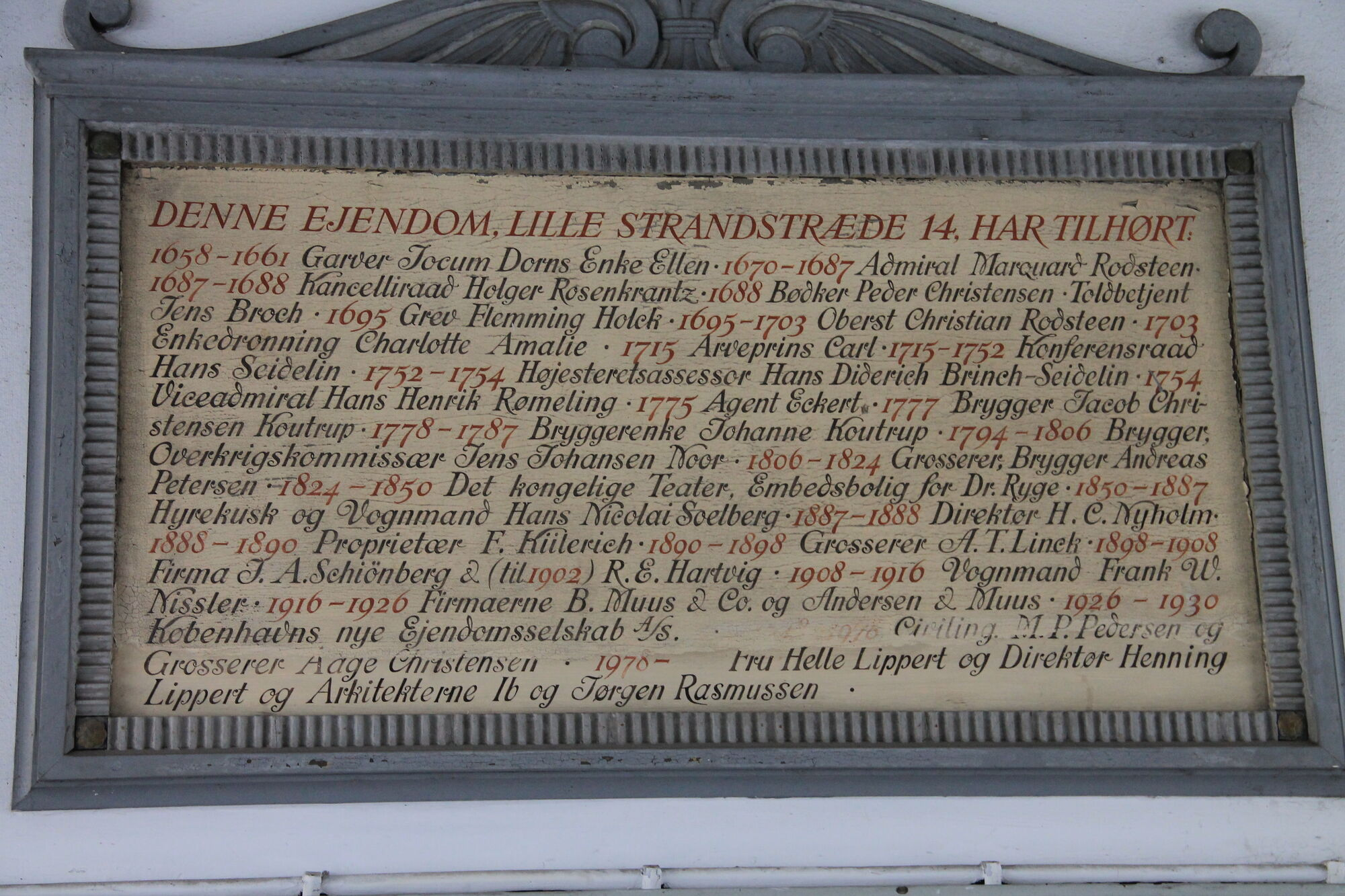
List of former owners inside the gateway

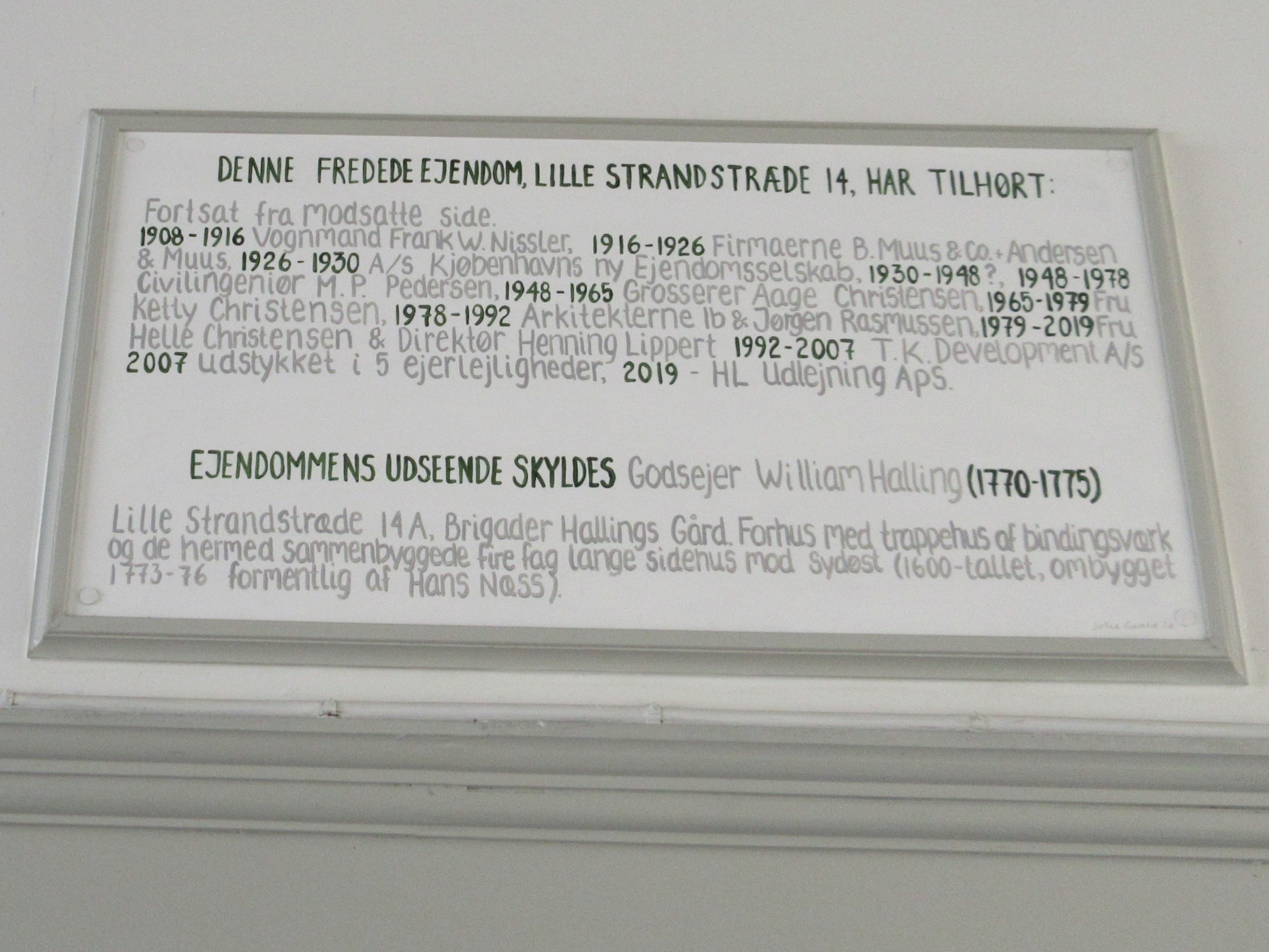
List of former owners inside the gateway

- 1658–1661: Jocum Dorn's widow Ellen
- 1670–1687: Admiral Marquarc Rodsteen
- 1687–1688: Kancelliråd Holger Rosenkrantz
- 1688: Peder Christensen
  - Jens Broch
- 1695: Flemming Holck
- 1695–1703: Oberst Christian Rodsteen
- 1703: Dowager Queen Charlotte Amalie
- 1715: Prince Carl
- 1715-1752: Konferenceråd Hans Seidelin
- 1752-1754: Hans Diderich Brinch-Seidelin
- 1754: Vice Admiral Hans Henrik Rømeling
- 1775: Agent Eckert
- 1777: Brewer Jacob Christensen Koutrup
- 1778–1787: Johanne Koutrup
- 1794–1796: Brewer, commander-in-chief Jens Johansen Noor
- 1806–1824: Brewer, grocer Andreas Petersen
- 1824–1850: Royal Danish Theatre – Dr. Ryge
- 1850–1887: Cartman Hans Nicolai Soelberg
- 1887–1888: Director H. C. Nyholm
- 1888–1890: Proprietor F. Külerich
- 1890–1898: A. T. Linek
- 1898–1908: J. A. Schiönberg and R. E. Hartvig Corporation
- 1902–1909: J. A. Schiönberg & Co.
- 1908–1916: Cartman Frank W. Nissler
- 1916–1926: B. Muus & Co. and Andersen & Muus
- 1926–1930: Københavns Nye Ejendomsselskab A/S
- 1930– 1948: ?
- 1948–1978: Civil engineer M. P. Pedersen
- 1948–1965: Grocer Aage Christensen
- 1965–1979: Ms. Ketty Christensen
- 1978–1992: Ib & Jørgen Rasmussen, architects
- 1979–2019: Ms. Helle Christensen and director Henning Lippert
- 1992–2007: T.K. Development A/S
- 2007: Subdivided into five condominiums
- 2019– : HL Udlejning ApS.
