= William Halling =

Danish nabob and landowner (1744–1796)

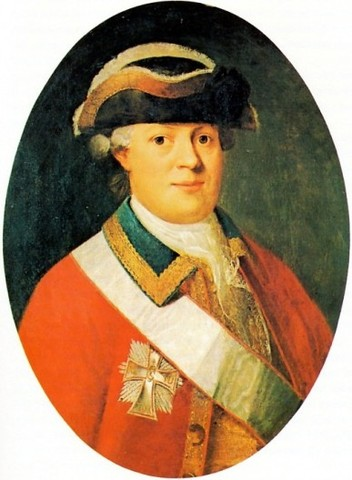
- Portrait of Halling from the 1790s
- Born: 19 March 1744; Hårslev, Denmark
- Died: 12 April 1796 (aged 52); Dronninglund, Denmark
- Known for: Brigadér Halling House, Dronninglund
- Awards: Order of the Dannebrog

William Halling (born Vitus Halling; 19 March 1744–12 April 1796), frequently referred to as Brigadér Halling after 1772, was a Danish nabob and landowner. He owned the Brigadér Halling House in Copenhagen and Dronninglund in Vendsyssel.

== Early life ==
Halling was born in the rectory in Hårslev on Zealand, the son of the local vicar Mogens Halling and his wife Elisabeth Marie née Olivarius. The family came from the Halling Valley in Akershus, Norway. In 1859 he became an assistant in the Danish Asiatic Company in Copenhagen.

== Years in India ==
He travelled to Tranquebar in 1760 and a few years later continued to College on the Malabar Coast. He was promoted to senior assistant (overassistent) but fell foul of opperhoved P. Scheel and returned to Tranquebar in 1766 from where he continued to Bengal to enroll in the British army. He served under Major-General Robert Clive, was promoted to captain, and, probably in Spanish service, took part in the conquest of Manila.

== Return to Denmark ==
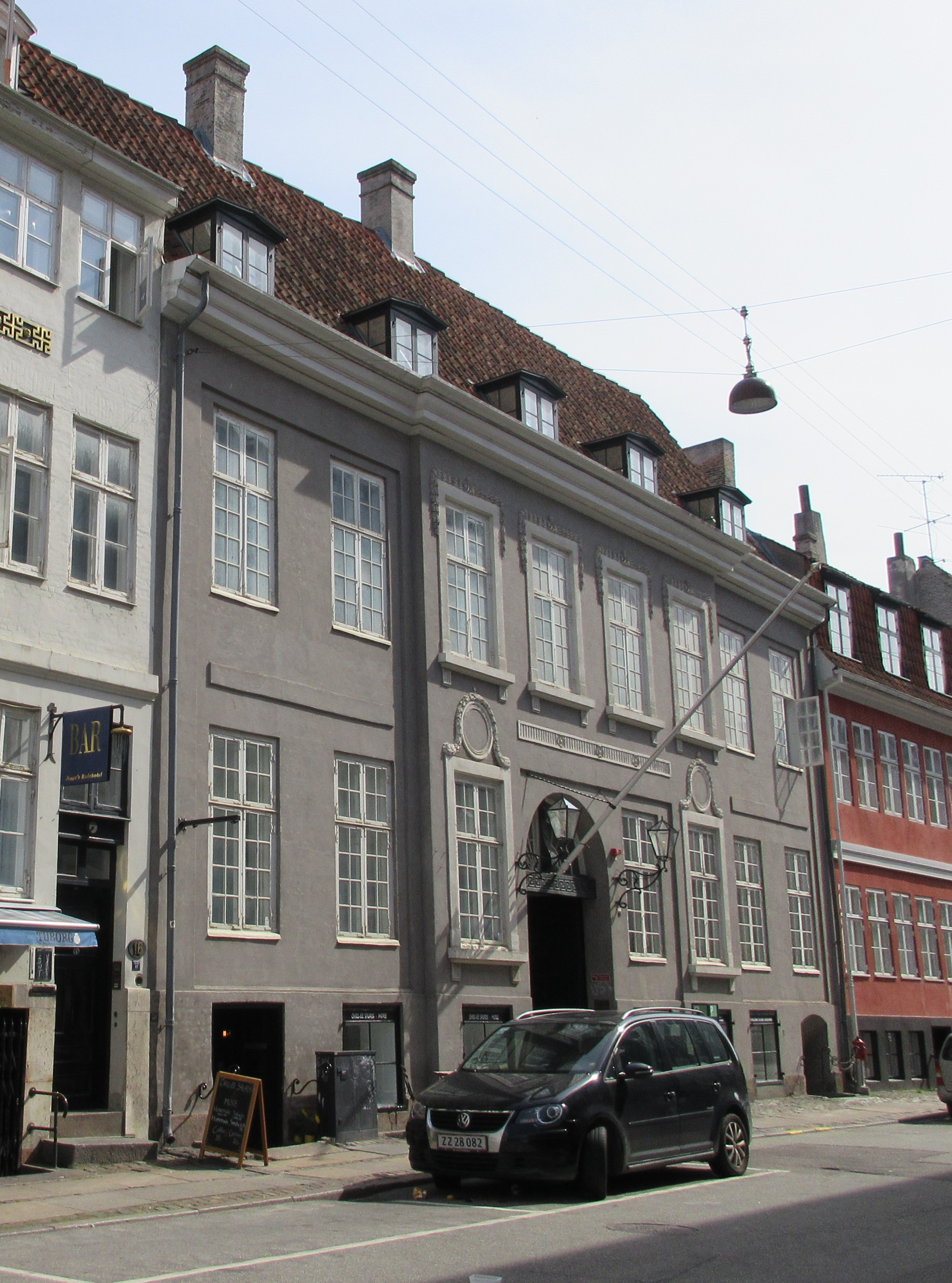
The Brigadér Halling House in Copenhagen, now housing the Maltese embassy

Halling achieved considerable wealth during his years in India. On his way back to Denmark, on board a ship to the Netherlands, he was captured by pirates and brought to Algiers where he was sold as a slave. He finally made it back to Denmark in about 1772. In 1773, he purchased the Brigadér title for 1,000 Danish rigsdaler. He was given the rank of Major-General and became part of the board of directors in the Danish Asia Company. He purchased a house in Lille Strandstræde and commissioned the architect Hans Næss to undertake a comprehensive refurbishment of the property. He also acquired the Bryskesborg estate in Jutland, renaming it Qilliamsborg.

In January 1774, he married Christine Linde Hvas de Lindenpalmm the only daughter of Jørgen Hvas de Lindenpalm. As part of the marriage agreement, with effect from 1 May 1774, he received the estate Tirsbæk at a low price as well as 10m000 rigsdaler in the gand as dowry.

== Landowner in Jutland ==
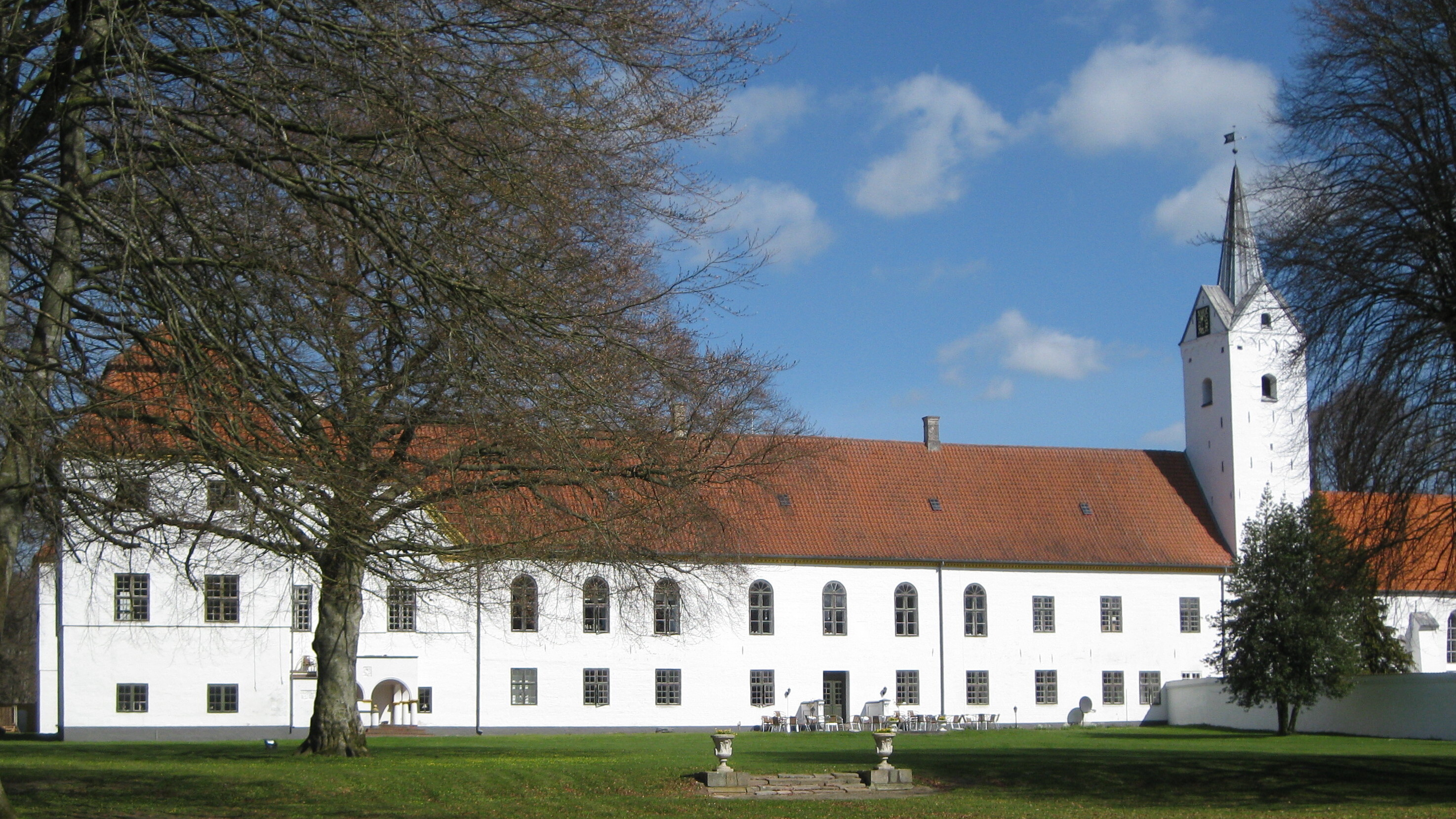
Dronninglund Castle

In 1776, he ceded Tirsbæk to count Caspar von Moltke in exchange for Dronninglund in Vendsyssel. Here later constructed a large town mansion in Aalborg (now Hotel Phønic). He also acquired Petersholm at Vejle and Kærgård in the parish of Hunderup. He also purchased a property in the Vesterbro area of Aalborg and constructed a large town mansion (now Hotel Phønix). In 1776 he became a White Knight at a cost of 10,000 rigsdaler and was ennobled by letter patent in 1783.

== Legacy ==
Halling has a reputation for being a brutal ruler of his estate and for leading a somewhat bizarre lifestyle. The rough treatment of tenant farmers was, however, a common phenomenon at the time. He had an Indian servant and brought and had acquired an oriental taste for splendor during his years in India. His marriage was unhappy and the couple lived apart at times.

Halling constructed 21 residences for soldiers on the Dronninglund estate. He launched a programme which taught boys a craft and hired a physician on the estate in 1790. In 1796, he created a trust for indigent residents of the Dronninglund estate.

Halling died in 1796. His widow sold Dronninglund in 1806. She then settled at Keldkær where she died a very wealthy woman in 1817.
