= Halling (surname) =

Halling is a surname. Notable people with the surname include:

- Jonas Halling (born 1989), Danish professional football player
- Luovi Halling (1867–1928), U.S. Navy sailor and a recipient the Medal of Honor
- Nick Halling, British sports broadcaster and journalist
- Roy Halling (born 1950), American mycologist
