= Hundslund Priory =

Former Benedictine religious house near Aalborg, Denmark

Coordinates: 57.1552°N 10.2616°E

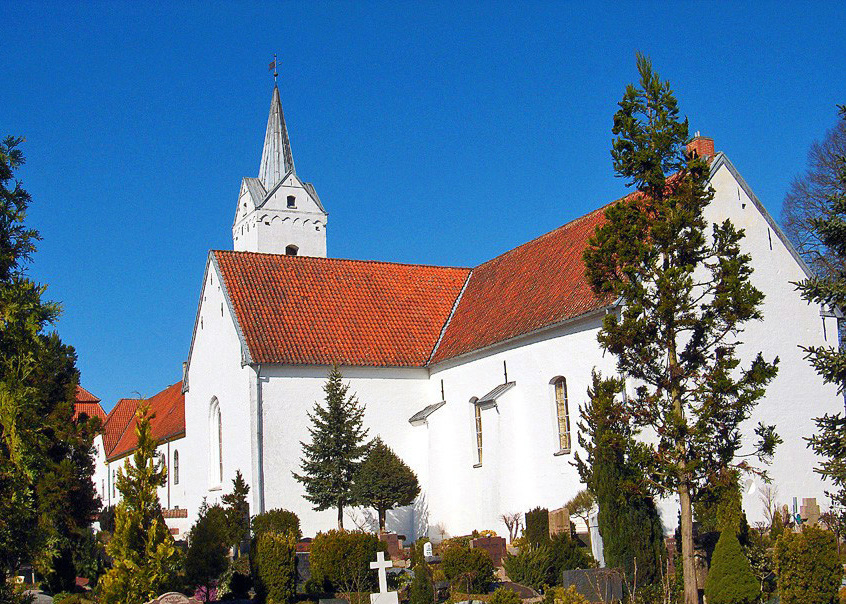
Dronninglund Church was erected in relation to the priory at some point between 1160 and 1200 and was originally named Hundslund Church. It have seen a lot of reconstruction since the Reformation.

Hundslund Priory was a prominent Benedictine religious house in medieval Denmark. It was later transformed into the royal residence Dronninglund Castle. It is located at Dronninglund, north of Aalborg, Denmark.

The priory was established about 1100 on a royal farm given by King Erik II Emune. The priory was built north of Aalborg for Benedictine nuns. It was dedicated to St. Mary and St. Clement (both names were used in documents).

== History ==
The original church was built in Romanesque style with rounded arches and a flat timber ceiling. The old church was replaced in 1350 and then renovated several times into the remarkable structure which can still be seen today in its late Gothic form.

The priory had three ranges attached to the church, so that it formed an enclosure to separate the nuns from the rest of the community. One range was used as a dormitory, a second for a refectory and cellars, and the third for lay sisters and unmarried noble women who lived at the priory.

Margaret I gave income properties to Hundslund in the early 14th century, and her favor brought additional gifts from noble families, making the abbey the owner of farms, mills, and other rent property for the sustenance of the abbey. It became one of the largest landowners in northern Jutland.

Hundslund Priory was involved in a lengthy lawsuit with State Councillor Anders Banner over the boundary between his estate and priory lands in 1455. The priory accused Banner of ordering his servants to move the boundary staves and then hired 25 witnesses at the local assembly to say that no one had claimed the disputed land for more than 60 years. Banner was excommunicated by the Bishop of Børglum for his intransigence. The suit was mediated by King Christoffer I at Kalundborg in 1468.

Anders Gyldenstierne was appointed superintendent of the secularized priory in 1531. In the confusion during Skipper Clement's 1534–1535 rebellion, the nuns were literally thrown out of the priory in 1535 by the last Catholic Bishop of Børglum, Stygge Krumpen. Krumpen occupied the priory with his retainers. Gyldenstierne complained on behalf of the nuns to Christian III. The king wanted to strip Bishop Krumpen of his power in order to get control of the State Council and establish the Lutheran Ordinances. The king ordered him out of the priory and restored it to Anders Gyldenstierne and ordered him to keep an eye out for the king's interest in the estate until 1555. The abbey became a home for former nuns and unmarried women until 1572. The entire archive of the priory was transferred to Aalborg Castle, where it was inventoried, but all documents were lost. A few letters regarding Hundslund were preserved in other archives, including the letters of gift from Margaret I.

In 1561 the mortgage on the abbey was paid off by one of Denmark's leading noblemen, Corfitz Uhlfeldt. Hundslund Priory passed into private ownership in 1581, when Frederik II sold the abbey and its properties to the nobleman Johannes Linenov.

== Sources ==
- 'Dronninglund Church' (in Danish)
- 'Dronninglund'. Salmonsens Konversationslexikon. p. 435 (in Danish)
