= Store Vildmose =

Protected bog in Denmark

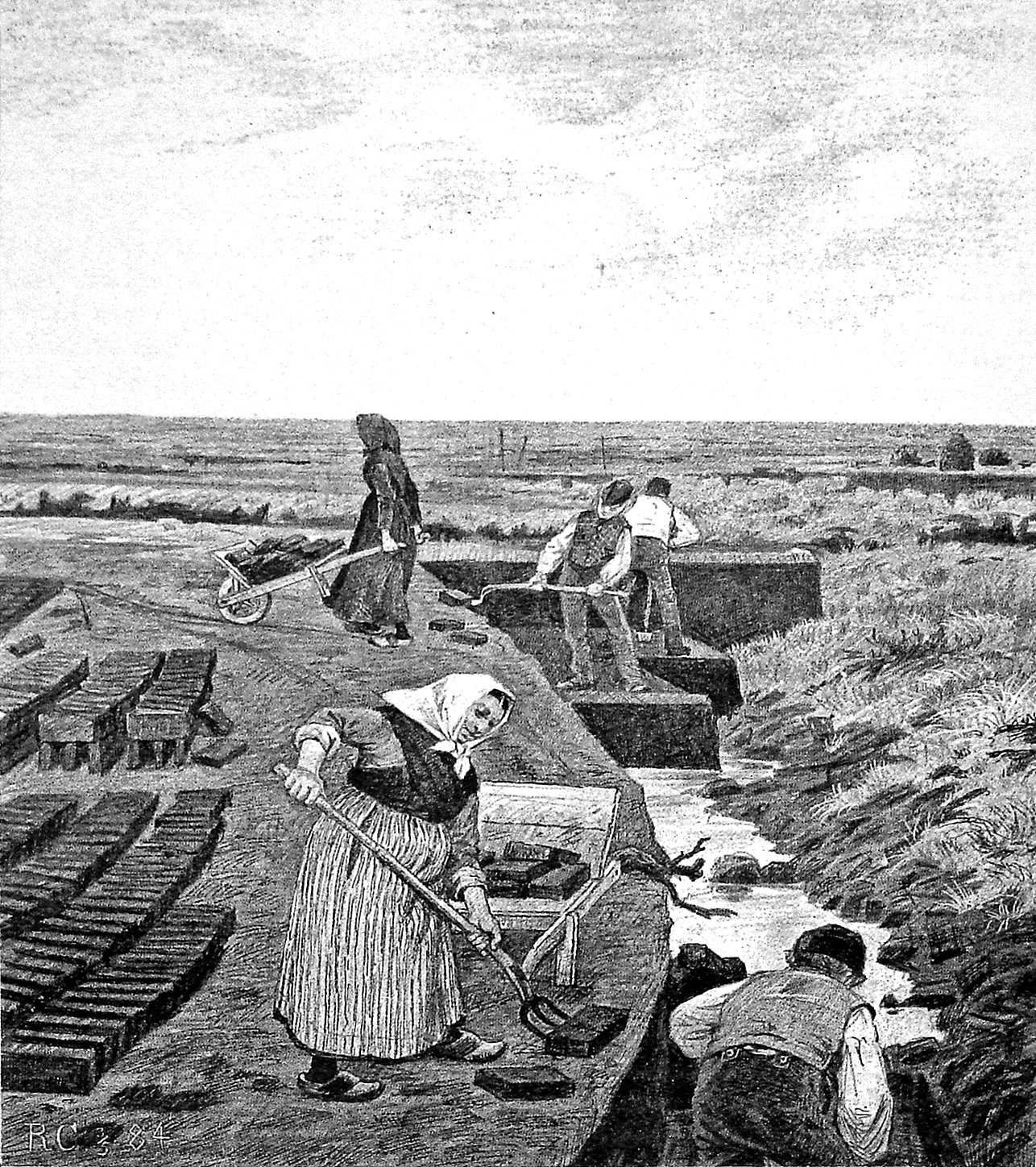
- Peatcutting in Vildmosen, Jutland, Denmark
- Interactive map of Store Vildmose
- Location: Denmark
- Nearest city: Aalborg
- Coordinates: 57°13′26″N 9°46′55″E
- Area: 1,895 hectares (4,680 acres)
- Established: 1940, 1973 and 2000

Store Vildmose (lit.: Large Wild-bog) is bogland located in northern Jutland, Vendsyssel, about 20 km north-west of Aalborg. It is the remnant of an extensive raised peat bog, in large part drained by constructed canals in the early 20th century. Some areas are still relatively untouched and give an impression of the original nature of this bog.

The area has both national and international importance, as it presents one of the largest contiguous areas of raised bog in Denmark, home to many rare animals and plants. Store Vildmose covers an area of about 6,000 hectares today, of which 1,895 hectares are protected areas. Most of the protections are designated for EU habitat, but the boglands are also to be protected as a scientific and archaeological important conservation zone.

Store Vildmose is part of the Natura 2000 network.

== History ==
In the Stone Age, the area was a big lake, which eventually dried up and was later cultivated by Iron Age farmers. In the Middle Ages, climate change had increased precipitation, stimulating the spread of peat moss and turning the area into one of the largest bogs in Europe. Store Vildmose eventually reached its maximum area in the 1800s, before drainage and peat cutting on a larger scale was initiated. As the peat has been dug up through the ages, various relics and artifacts from the Iron Age have been unearthed.

=== Farming ===
Between 1920 and 1945, most of the area became farmland, where so-called 'vildmose potatoes' are grown, considered a culinary speciality of Northern Jutland. Some of the benefits of potatoes from Store Vildmose are that the peels are very thin and smooth, that they do not soften easily with cooking and their taste. Several species are grown and sold under the name 'vildmose potatoes'. The potato-growers guild in Store Vildmose consists of six cooperating growers and they are working towards creating a regional- and event-center in one of the old stable farms in the area, through the fund of Vildmoseporten (The Vildmose Gate).

There is a regional museum in the town of Brønderslev by the name of 'Vildmosemuseet', concentrating on the cultural history of the bog area.

== Nature ==
Store Vildmose is home to many rare and uncommon species, since the habitats it presents are threatened naturetypes. In the boglands, one can find cloudberry, the carnivorous great sundew and a breeding population of corn crake, that have otherwise seen a steep decline in western Europe. The marsh fritillary used to live here, but have not been observed for the last 20 years. Otter also used to roam here and might be establishing again in the near future, along with sea lamprey. Both species are to be protected in Denmark.
