= Comwell H.C. Andersen Hotel =

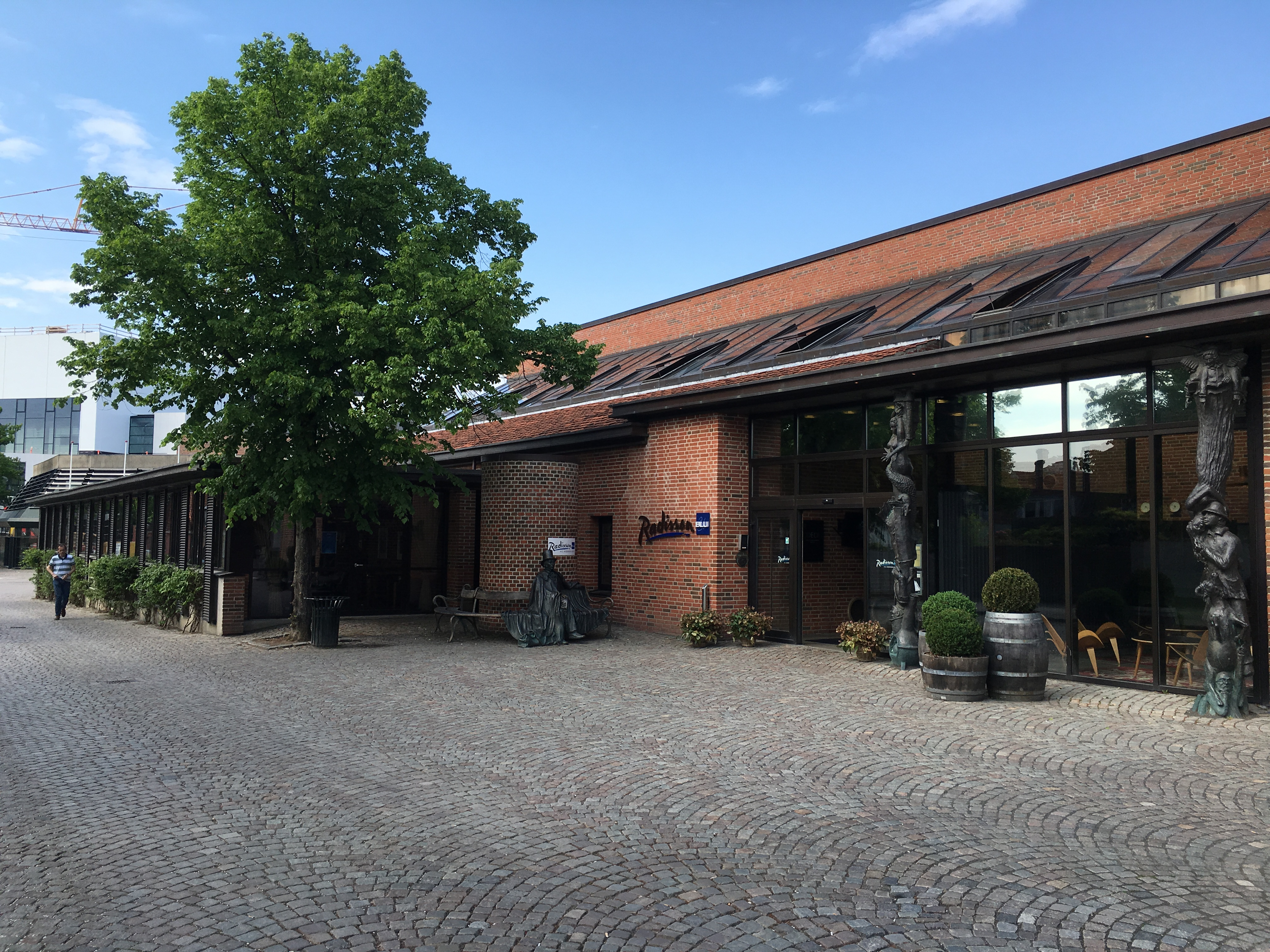
- Comwell H.C. Andersen Hotel
- Interactive map of the Comwell H.C. Andersen Hotel area

General information
- Location: Claus Bergsgade, Odense, Denmark
- Coordinates: 55°23′56″N 10°23′33″E
- Opening: 1982
- Management: Comwell Hotels

Website
- Official hotel website

Comwell H.C. Andersen Hotel is a hotel in Odense, Denmark. Formerly managed by Radisson Hotels as Radisson SAS H.C. Andersen Hotel and then Radisson Blu H.C. Andersen Hotel, it is named after Hans Christian Andersen, the most famous figure of the city. Built from red brick, the hotel contains 145 rooms and is served by a French restaurant. The rooms of the hotel are designed in the "1960s Nordic-style". Frommer's stated that "it may lack the nostalgic charm of the [Clarion Hotel] Plaza, but commercial travelers find this first-class hotel more convenient and livelier." The hotel contains the Casino Odense, with blackjack and slot machine facilities.
