= Evergreen Hotel (Vancouver) =

- U.S. National Register of Historic Places
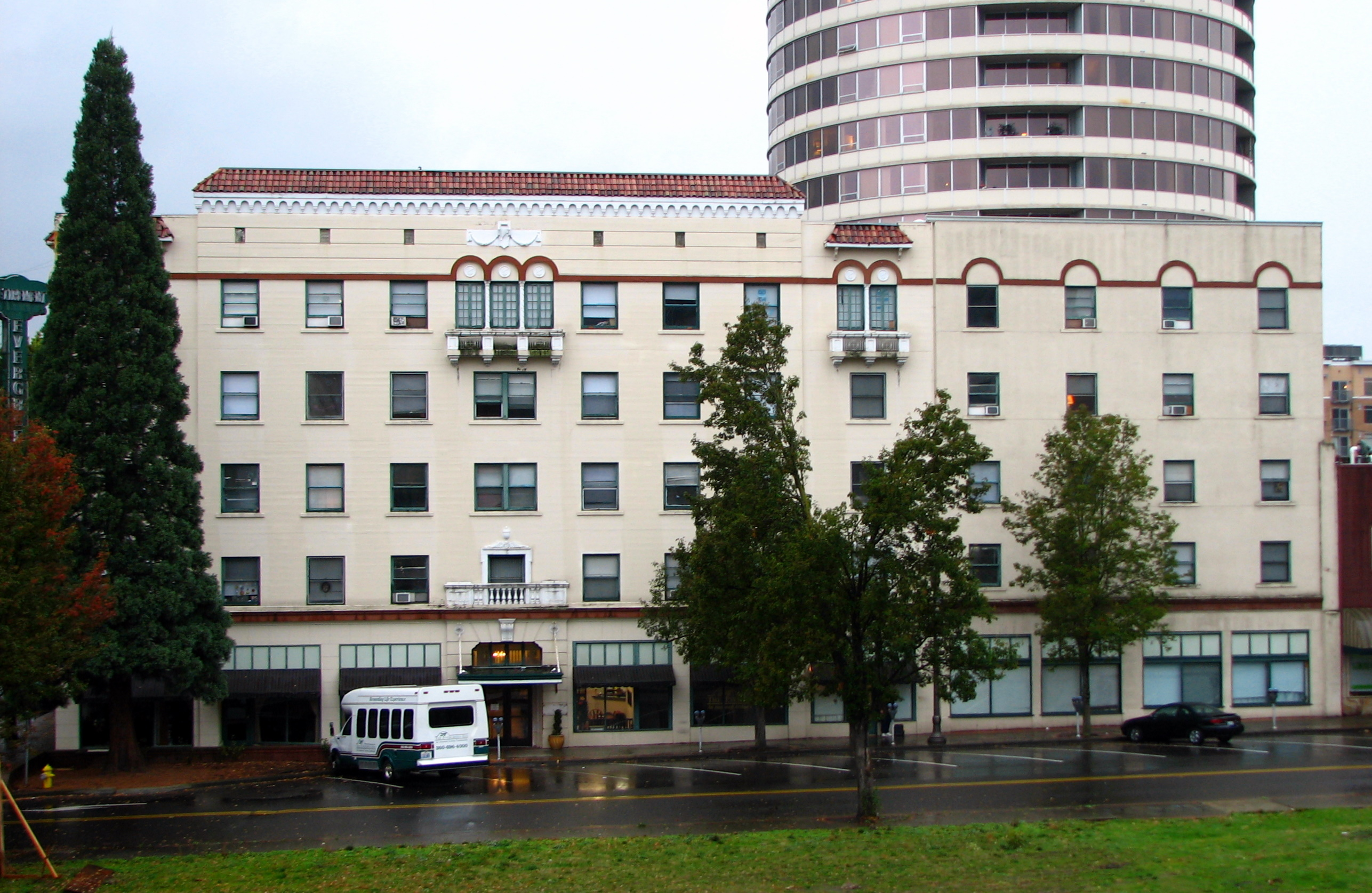

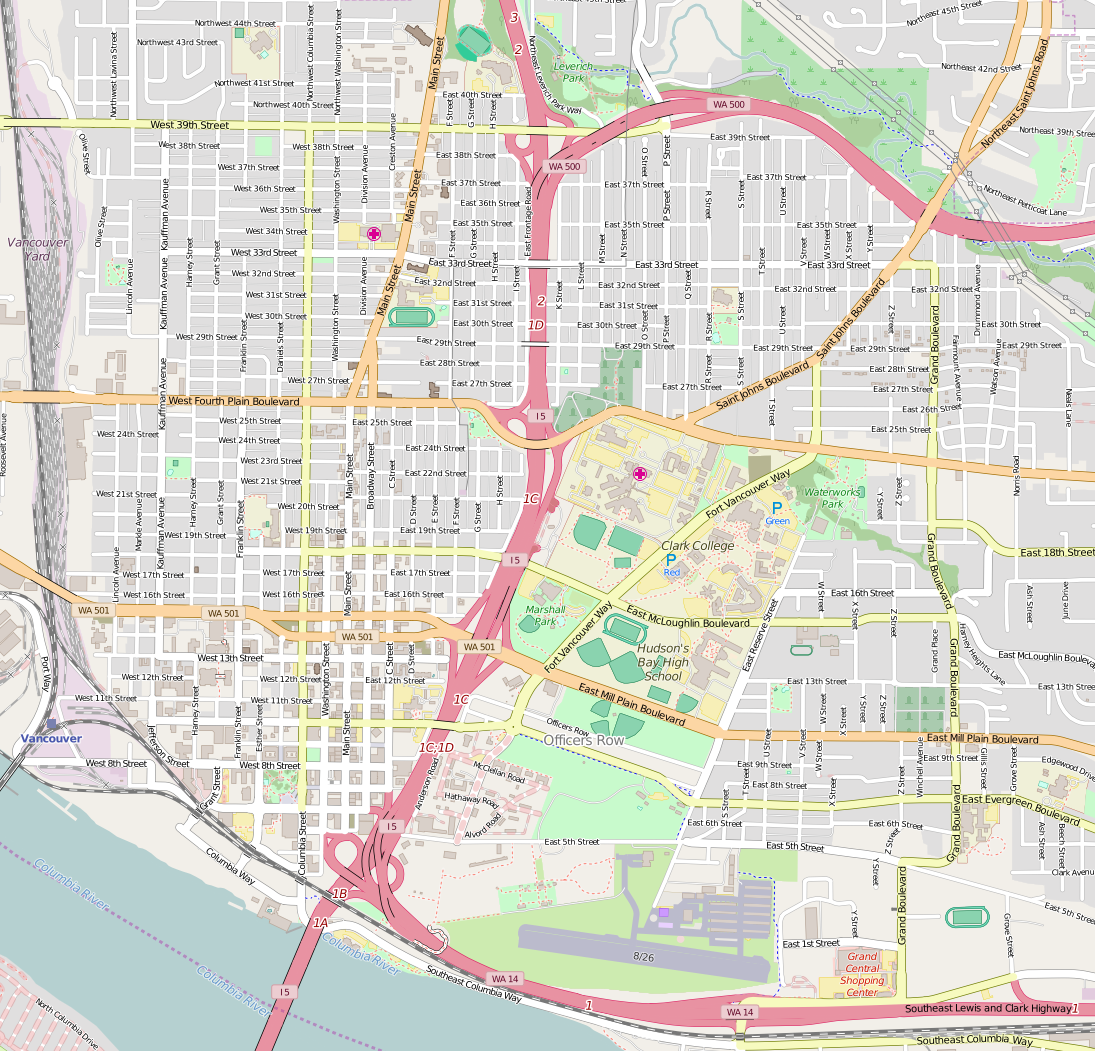
- Location within Vancouver Washington
- Location: 500 Main Street, Vancouver, Washington
- Coordinates: 45°37′31″N 122°40′19″W
- Built: 1928
- Architect: Tourtellotte & Hummel
- NRHP reference No.: 79002529
- Added to NRHP: January 1, 1979

The Evergreen Hotel is a former hotel located in Vancouver, Washington.

The hotel declined and eventually closed in the late 1970s. In 1987, it was converted into retirement housing. Today the building is closed to the public, although still a dominant feature in the historic South Main District in Vancouver.
