= Barceló Bávaro Grand Resort =

Resort in the Dominican Republic

Coordinates: 18.663°N 68.395°W

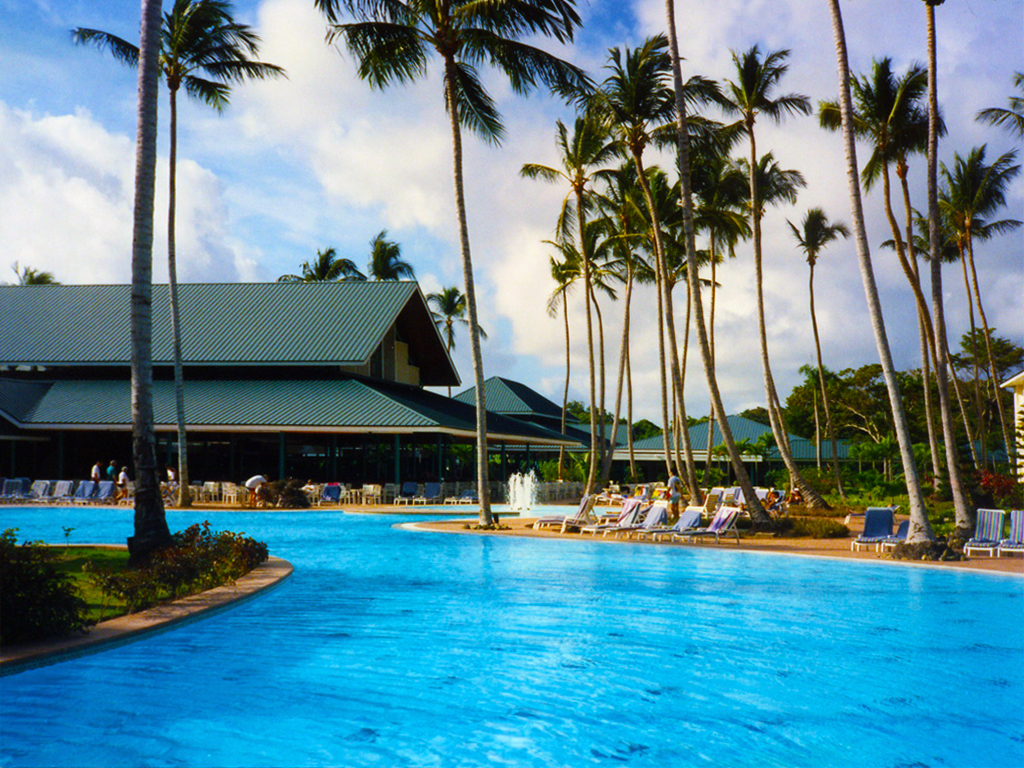
Bávaro Palace swimming pool

Barceló Bávaro Grand Resort, also known as Barceló Bávaro or simply as Barceló (in the surrounding areas), is a luxury hotel and resort in Punta Cana in the municipality of Higüey, in La Altagracia Province on the east coast of the Dominican Republic, owned by Barceló Hotels and Resorts. Established in 1992 at a reported US$250 million, it is one of the biggest complexes in the country. Since 2012, the resort had been dramatically renovated for a reported US$330 million.

== Features ==
Within the greater resort, there is the Barcelo Bavaro Palace Deluxe, which is family friendly. There is also the Barcelo Bavaro Beach, which is an adult only zone. Set in 2 kilometres (1.2 mi) of beach, it is cited as one of the biggest complexes in the country, it contains 11 restaurants, five swimming pools, a shopping centre, a gym, U-Spa Bávaro, an 18-hole golf course, a bar with thatched-roof, and a miniclub. Much of the interior is inspired by Danish design. As of 2010 it had 798 rooms, with outdoor patios and Jacuzzis. In 2020, was certified for anti-COVID-19 measures.

== Rooms ==
There are a number of different room options. These include the Junior Suite, the Superior Room, the Junior Suite Premium Level, the Suite Premium Level, Panoramic Suite Premium Level, Master Suite Premium Level and the Presidential Suite Premium Level.

== Events ==
=== 147th IOC Session ===
The resort will host the members of the International Olympic Committee for the 147th IOC Session in 2027, which will also take place at the resort.
