= Dronninglund Hotel =

Hotel in Dronninglund, Denmark

- Location within Denmark

General information
- Location: Slotsgade 78, Dronninglund, Denmark
- Coordinates: 57°9′32″N 10°17′31″E
- Opening: 1981

Technical details
- Floor count: 2

Other information
- Number of rooms: 72

Dronninglund Hotel is a hotel in Dronninglund, Denmark. The hotel was established in 1981 and was refurbished in 1999. The hotel has 72 rooms.
