= Jonas Halling =

Danish footballer (born 1989)

Jonas Halling Frederiksen
Personal information
- Date of birth: 16 November 1989 (age 36)
- Place of birth: Denmark
- Height: 1.81 m (5 ft 11 in)
- Position: Midfielder

Youth career
- Bredballe IF
- –2008: Vejle Boldklub

Senior career*
Years	Team	Apps	(Gls)
2008–2011	Vejle Boldklub	19	(1)
2010–2011	→ Kolding FC (loan)	11	(1)
- * Club domestic league appearances and goals

Jonas Halling (born 16 November 1989) is a Danish professional football player.
