= Dronninglund Castle =

Coordinates: 57.1552°N 10.2616°E

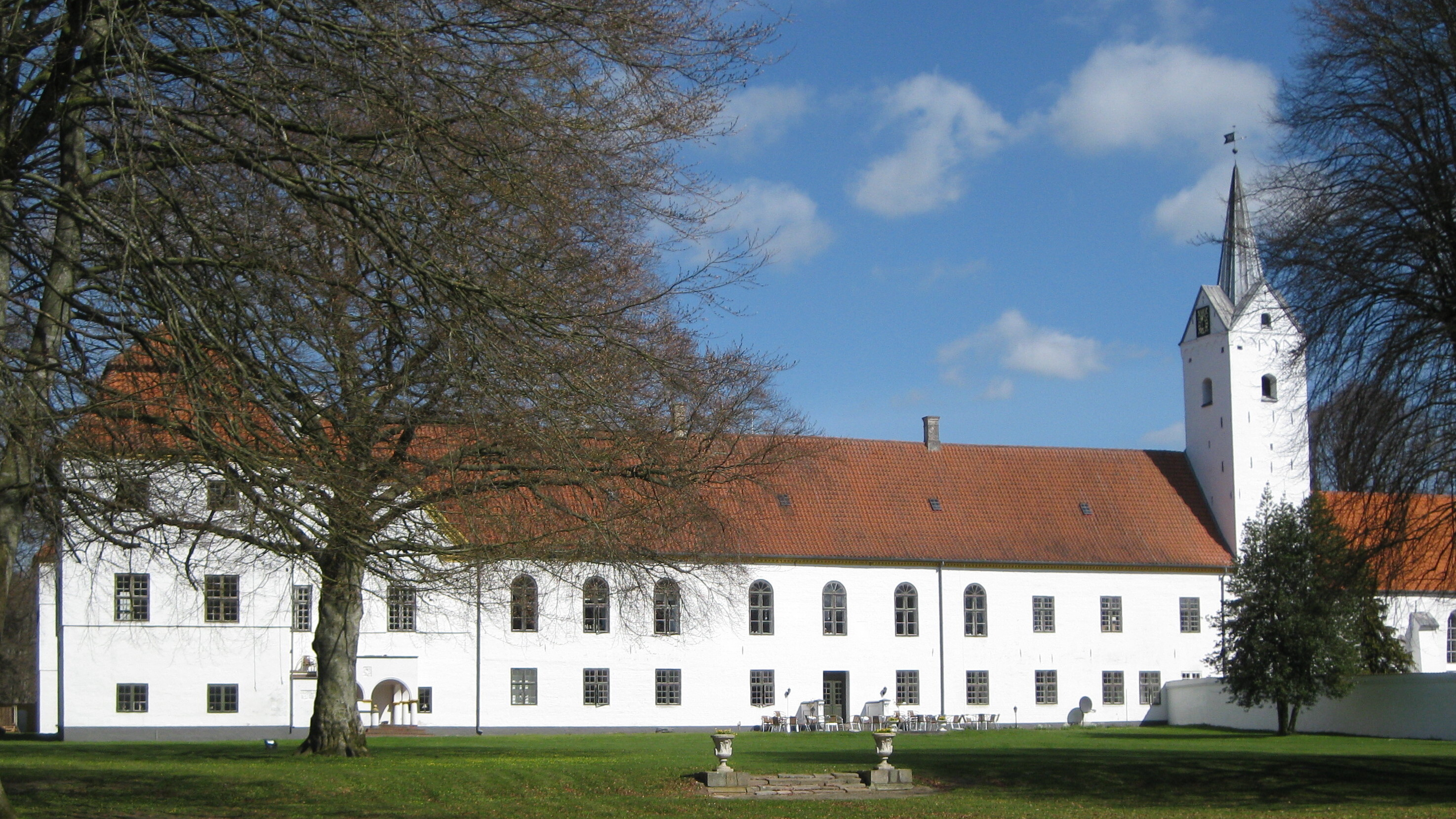
Dronninglund Castle.

Dronninglund Castle (Danish: Dronninglund Slot) is a former royal residence located in the town of Dronninglund in the northern part of the Jutland Peninsula, Denmark.

== History ==
The castle's history goes back to the 12th century, when it was the Benedictine monastery of Hundslund Priory. After the last nuns left in 1581, it was first owned by the Lindenow family. In 1690, Queen Charlotte Amalie acquired it. It is from her, that the palace takes the name Dronninglund, meaning queen-grove.

Today the Castle of Dronninglund is owned by the fund of ”Marie E. & Harald Høgsbros fond til bevarelse af Dronninglund Slot” and is thereby an independent and self-governing institution. The first paragraph in the fund-regulations reads:

§1: To own and preserve Dronninglund Castle and adjoining property.

The castle now works as a hotel, a restaurant and a meeting place for conferences and larger gatherings like weddings, official meetings and various workshops. The restaurant runs a catering service as well.

== Sources ==
- Dronninglund Castle Official homepage
- J.P. Trap: Kongeriget Danmark, 4. udg. 1924 (in Danish)
- Ole Torp Andersen: Dronninglund Castle : royalty, nobility and civilians, 2006, ISBN 87-89109-92-9 (in Danish)
- The History of Dronninglund Castle (in Danish)
