= Dronninglund =

Town in Denmark

- Town
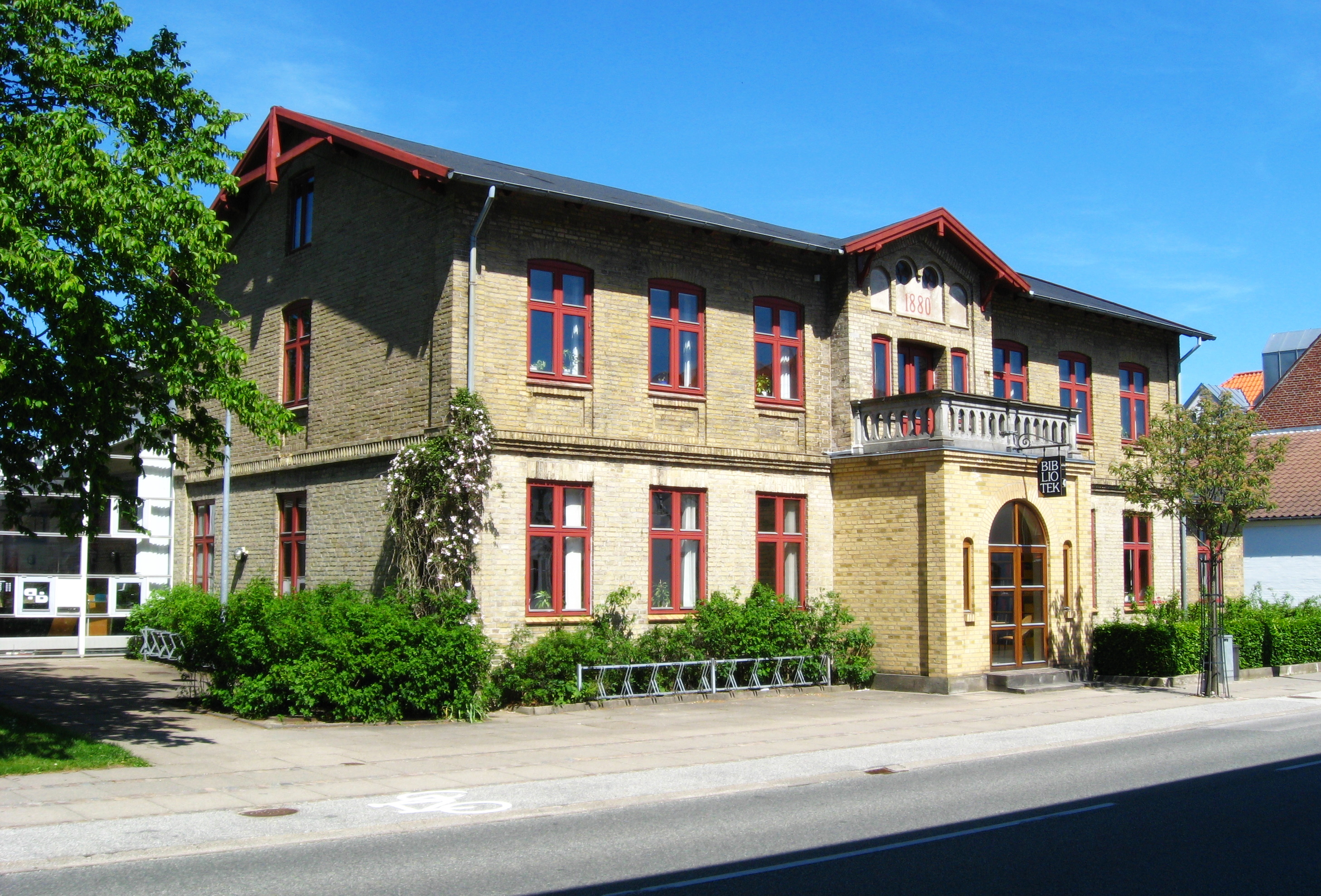
- The local library of Dronninglund

- Location in Denmark Dronninglund (North Jutland Region)
- Coordinates: 57°9′30″N 10°17′16″E
- Country: Denmark
- Region: Region Nordjylland
- Municipality: Brønderslev Municipality

Area
  - Urban: 2.6 km^{2} (1.0 sq mi)

Population (2026)
  - Urban: 3,769
  - Urban density: 1,400/km^{2} (3,800/sq mi)
- Time zone: UTC+1 (CET)
  - Summer (DST): UTC+2 (CEST)
- Postal code: DK-9330 Dronninglund

Dronninglund is a town with a population of 3,769 (1 January 2026) in Brønderslev Municipality, Region Nordjylland near the North Jutlandic Island's eastern coast in northern Denmark.

Dronninglund was the municipal seat of the former Dronninglund Municipality, until 1 January 2007.

== Dronninglund Municipality ==
The former Dronninglund Municipality was a municipality (Danish, kommune) in North Jutland County, until 1 January 2007. The municipality covered an area of 316 km^{2}, and had a total population of 15,213 (2005). Its last mayor was Mikael Klitgaard, a member of the Venstre (Liberal Party) political party.

Dronninglund Municipality ceased to exist as the result of Kommunalreformen ("The Municipality Reform" of 2007). It was merged with Brønderslev municipality to form the new Brønderslev Municipality. This created a municipality with an area of 630 km^{2} and a total population of 35,320 (2005).

== Facilities and Attractions ==
Perhaps the best known attraction in Dronninglund is Dronninglund Castle, founded in the 12th century.

Dronninglund Church was erected at some point between 1160 and 1200 in relation to the former Hundslund Priory at Dronninglund Castle.

Dronninglund is home to the museums of Try Museum and Dorf Møllegård (Dorf Mill-farm). They are both part of The Museums in Brønderslev Municipality, which comprise a total of three state-recognized museums. The third museum is the regional-museum Vildmosemuseet in Brønderslev.

The Dronninglund Hotel was established in 1981. It was refurbished in 1999 and has 72 rooms.

== Notable people ==
- Stine Jørgensen (born 1990 in Dronninglund) a Danish handball player for Odense Håndbold and the Danish national team

== Sources ==
- Municipal statistics: NetBorger Kommunefakta, delivered from KMD aka Kommunedata (Municipal Data)
- Municipal mergers and neighbors: Eniro new municipalities map
