= Lisbeth Zornig Andersen =

Danish economist, activist, author

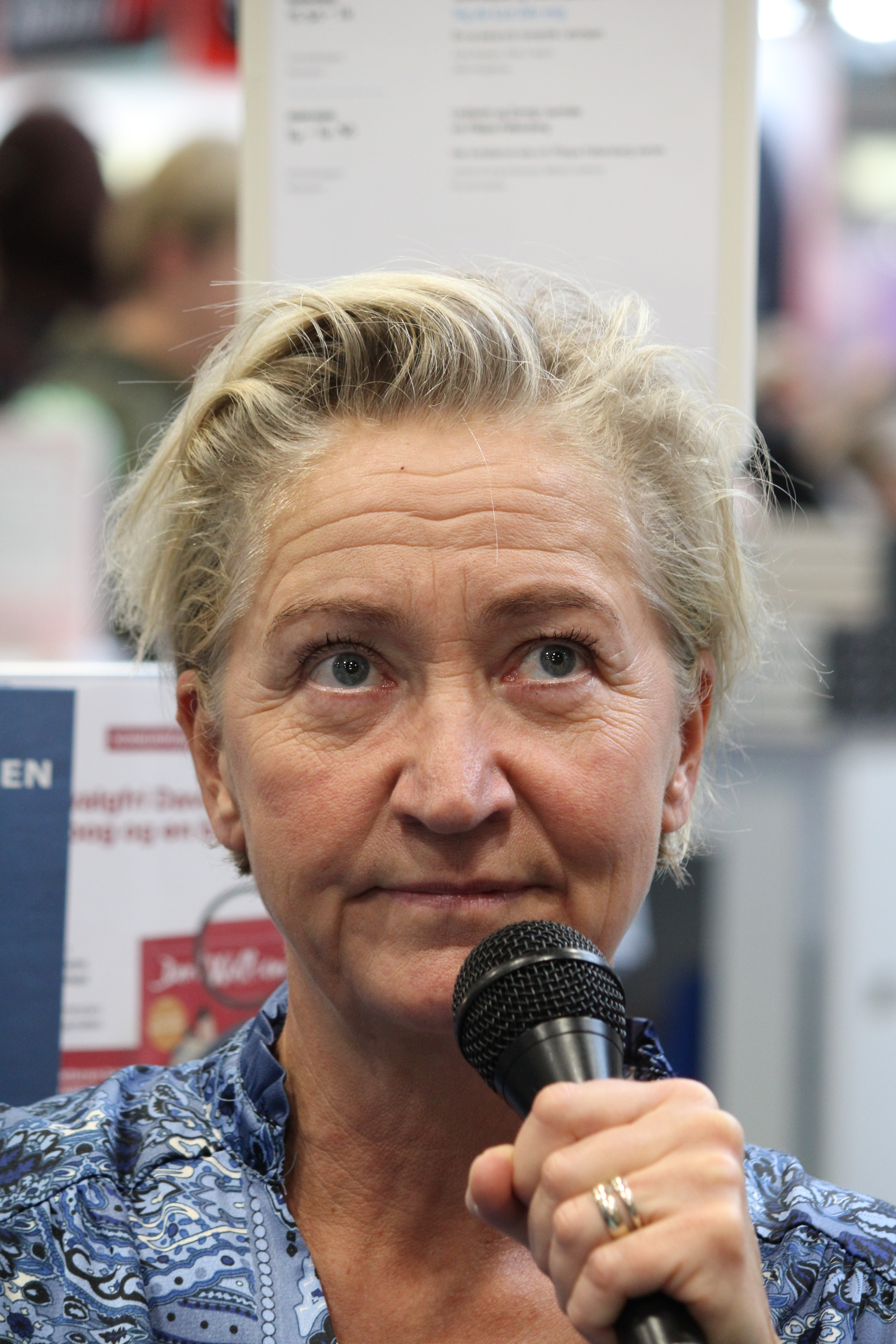
Zornig Andersen in 2025

Lisbeth Malene Zornig Andersen (born 12 February 1968) is a Danish economist, activist, and author. She is a debater in the area of social policy, and her focus is on marginalized people, especially children. She has been involved in a variety of business endeavours and non-profit organisations, including: Huset Zornig, Social Innovations Forum, Children's IT-foundation, Specialisterne. She has also been a board member and ambassador for a number of Danish organizations and institutions, for example the Danish IT University and Danish Red Cross.

She is a reoccurring guest in TV debates and has written opinion pieces for a number of Danish newspapers. In 2011, 2012, 2013, 2014, and 2015 she was on Politiken's list of the 50 most influential Danish opinion makers. Her autobiography was a bestseller for almost two years and the documentary about her childhood, My childhood in hell (Danish: Min barndom i helvede), won an award for best documentary of the year in 2012. She has also received awards for both radio and TV shows, noticeably Zornig’s Zone and The burned children (Danish: De brændte børn).

== Personal life ==
Lisbeth Zornig Andersen grew up in a lower-class family in Nakskov, Denmark with three older brothers, of whom only one is still alive today. As a child, she suffered from sexual abuse and neglect. Throughout her childhood she was placed in a number of out-of-home child care institutions. Today Lisbeth has five children and is married to journalist and former editor-in-chief, Mikael Rauno Lindholm. The abuse and problems that dominated her childhood, as well as the factors that helped her break with her family's social pattern and class are depicted in her autobiography Zornig: Anger is my middle name (Danish: Zornig: Vrede er mit mellemnavn).

In 2016, Lisbeth and her husband Mikael Rauno Lindholm were convicted of human trafficking after having aided a family of Syrian refugees with small children by giving them a ride on Danish roads. The ruling was controversial and made headlines in newspapers globally.

== Career ==
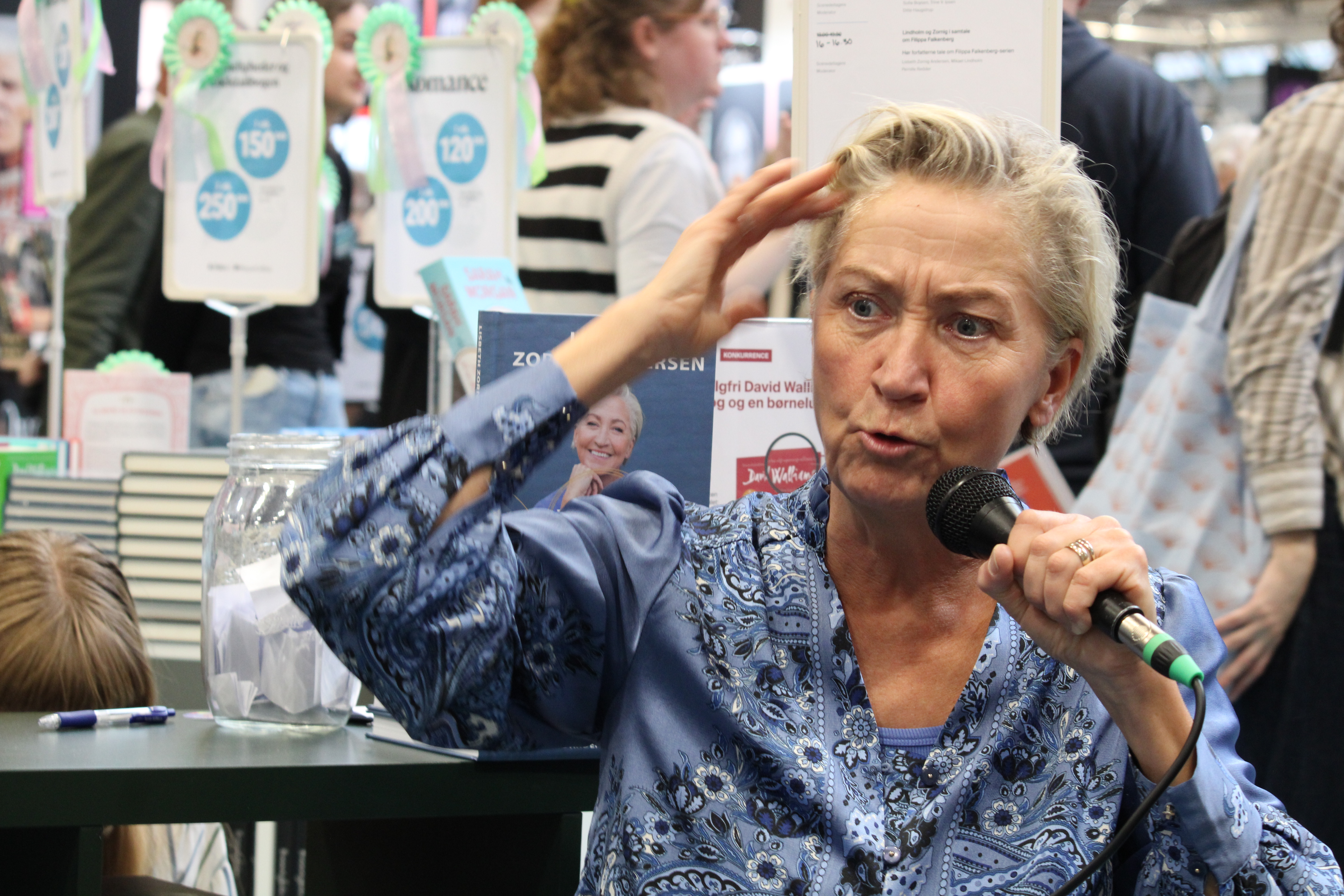
Zornig Andersen at Bogforum 2025 in Bella Center

After completing high school she went on to study economics at Copenhagen University where she completed her master's degree with a specialty in game theory. After finishing her master's degree in economics, Lisbeth Zornig Andersen became an IT specialist for Codan, Danske Bank, and KMD. In 2006, she became a business developer for Specialisterne, a socioeconomic business employing people with Asperger syndrome as IT testers. Later, in 2008, she was promoted to CEO by the same company.

From 2010 to 2012, Lisbeth Zornig Andersen was chair of the Danish Children's Council (Danish: Børnerådet), a governmental council fighting for the rights of children and the youth. During her time as chair, Lisbeth contributed to a number of improvements for the marginalized youth. Noticeable was, for example, a new law establishing new procedures and tighter requirements to the reaction time of municipalities in cases of child abuse.

In 2012 she started her own business, Huset Zornig (English: House of Zornig). Huset Zornig is a socioeconomic business that works with social innovation in the form of development of new methods and praxis and distribution of research and knowledge within the area of social policy. This is done through lectures, conferences, publishing as well as by consulting authorities and private companies. Lisbeth Zornig Andersen has initiated a number of other social projects. Most noticeable is, perhaps, the democracy campaign "Votes on the Edge" (Danish: "Stemmer på kanten"), which successfully attempted to increase voter turn-out among socially marginalized people in Denmark. The turn-out among marginalized people rose by 28%, 9 percent points more than for the general population. She is also the founder and chair of the social policy think tank Social Innovations Forum and the founder of the Children's IT-foundation, which provides computers to children placed in out-of-home care.

She became famous in Denmark after the documentary My Childhood in Hell, depicting her childhood in a dysfunctional family where she was the victim of, among other things, sexual abuse. The documentary followed her autobiography Zornig: Anger is my middle name. In addition to her autobiographical works, she and her husband have published several crime novels.
