= Danish Gambit =

Position: a8 black rook, b8 black knight, c8 black bishop, d8 black queen, e8 black king, f8 black bishop, g8 black knight, h8 black rook, a7 black pawn, b7 black pawn, c7 black pawn, d7 black pawn, f7 black pawn, g7 black pawn, h7 black pawn, d4 black pawn, e4 white pawn, c3 white pawn, a2 white pawn, b2 white pawn, f2 white pawn, g2 white pawn, h2 white pawn, a1 white rook, b1 white knight, c1 white bishop, d1 white queen, e1 white king, f1 white bishop, g1 white knight, h1 white rook
- Moves: 1.e4 e5 2.d4 exd4 3.c3
- ECO: C21
- Origin: 1867
- Named after: Danish player Martin Severin From
- Parent: Center Game
- Synonyms: Nordic Gambit; Norwegian Gambit

The Danish Gambit, known as the Nordisches Gambit in German and the Noords Gambiet in Dutch (both meaning Nordic Gambit), is a chess opening that begins with the moves:

1. e4 e5
2. d4 exd4
3. c3

White will sacrifice one or two pawns for the sake of rapid development and the attack. However, with care, Black can accept one or both pawns safely, or simply decline the gambit altogether with good chances.

Although it may have been known earlier, Danish player Martin Severin From essayed the gambit in the Paris 1867 tournament and he is usually given credit for the opening. The Danish Gambit was popular with masters of the attack including Alekhine, Marshall, Blackburne, and Mieses, but as more defensive lines for Black were discovered and improved, it lost favor in the 1920s. Today it is rarely played in top-level chess.

== History ==
From the very beginning the nomenclature of the Danish Gambit was very confusing. The idea stems from a famous correspondence game London–Edinburgh, 1824: 1.e4 e5 2.Nf3 Nc6 3.d4 exd4 4.Bc4 Bc5 5.c3 Qe7 6.0-0 dxc3 7.Nxc3. The Swede Hans Lindehn played 1.e4 e5 2.d4 exd4 3.c3 on a regular basis from 1857 at the latest. He defeated the later World Champion Wilhelm Steinitz with his gambit in London, 1864. It is possible that Martin Severin From met Lindehn in Paris in this period and learned about the gambit there. According to Graham Burgess, in Denmark itself, the opening is called the Nordic Gambit.

Many games transposed to the Göring Gambit, as Nf3 for White and ...Nc6 for Black are logical moves. As Carl Theodor Göring also used to play the double gambit, there was hardly any difference.

The idea to sacrifice just one pawn (Nxc3) is older in the Göring Gambit than in the Danish. Paul Morphy encountered it at the first USA-Congress of 1857 against Alexander Meek. In the Danish, especially Alexander Alekhine applied 1.e4 e5 2.d4 exd4 3.c3 dxc3 4.Nxc3, but on unimportant occasions.

== Main lines ==
The Danish Gambit is a variation of the Center Game that is important enough to be treated on its own. It is C21 in the Encyclopaedia of Chess Openings classification.

After 1.e4 e5 2.d4 exd4 3.c3, Black can safely decline the gambit with 3...d6, 3...Qe7, or 3...d5 (Sörensen Defense or Capablanca Defence). If Black enters the Danish Gambit Accepted with 3...dxc3, the main possibilities are 4.Nxc3 and 4.Bc4.

=== Alekhine Variation: 4.Nxc3 ===
- 4...d6 5.Bc4 Nc6 6.Nf3 (Göring Gambit, by transposition)
- 4...Bc5 5.Bc4 Nc6 6.Nf3 (Göring Gambit, by transposition)
- 4...Nc6 5.Bc4 and 6.Nf3 (Göring Gambit, by transposition)
- 4...Bb4 5.Bc4 (5.Qd4 is an independent option) Bxc3+ 6.bxc3 d6 7.Qb3 Qe7 8.Ne2 Alekhine–Pomar, clock simul Madrid 1943

Alekhine recommended that White play 4.Nxc3. This line often transposes into the Göring Gambit of the Scotch Game. There are only few lines with Black omitting ...Nc6 and/or White omitting Nf3. This move order enables White to avoid the critical main line of the Göring Gambit (1.e4 e5 2.Nf3 Nc6 3.d4 exd4 4.c3 dxc3 5.Nxc3 Bb4) by keeping open the option of meeting an early ...Bb4 by developing the king's knight to e2 rather than f3 and thus preventing Black from disrupting White's queenside pawn structure, as Alekhine did in his game against Pomar above.

=== Lindehn's continuation: 4.Bc4 ===
Position: a8 black rook, b8 black knight, c8 black bishop, d8 black queen, e8 black king, f8 black bishop, g8 black knight, h8 black rook, a7 black pawn, b7 black pawn, c7 black pawn, d7 black pawn, f7 black pawn, g7 black pawn, h7 black pawn, c4 white bishop, e4 white pawn, a2 white pawn, b2 white bishop, f2 white pawn, g2 white pawn, h2 white pawn, a1 white rook, b1 white knight, d1 white queen, e1 white king, g1 white knight, h1 white rook

Danish Gambit Accepted after 1.e4 e5 2.d4 exd4 3.c3 dxc3 4.Bc4 cxb2 5.Bxb2
- 4...d6 5.Nxc3 (also Göring Gambit, by transposition)
- 4...cxb2 5.Bxb2 (Danish Gambit Accepted, see diagram)
  - 5...Bb4+ 6.Kf1 or 6.Nc3
  - 5...d6 6.Qb3
  - 5...d5 (Schlechter Defense)

White can instead offer a second pawn with 4.Bc4. The second pawn can be safely declined by transposing into the Göring Gambit. Accepting the pawn allows White's two bishops to rake the Black kingside after 4...cxb2 5.Bxb2. White will often follow up with Qb3 if possible, applying pressure on Black's b7- and f7-squares. Combined with White's long diagonal pressure on g7, this can make it difficult for Black's bishops to develop.

Carl Schlechter recommended one of the most reliable defenses for Black: by returning one of the pawns with 5...d5, Black gains time to complete development. After 6.Bxd5 Nf6 (6...Bb4+ is also possible) 7.Bxf7+ Kxf7 8.Qxd8 Bb4+ 9.Qd2 Bxd2+ 10.Nxd2 Re8 (Nyholm–Tartakower, Baden 1914), Black regains the queen. Most theorists evaluate this position as equal, but some believe that the queenside majority gives Black the advantage in the endgame (Schlechter suggested 10...c5!?).

The popularity of the Danish plummeted after Schlechter's defense was introduced as the resulting positions are not what White generally desires from a gambit opening. There have been attempts, especially by German correspondence player Ingo Firnhaber, to revive the gambit idea with 7.Nc3, but according to Karsten Müller and Martin Voigt in Danish Dynamite, this line gives insufficient compensation after 7...Nxd5 8.Nxd5 Nbd7 (8...c6?? 9.Nf6+) 9.Nf3 c6, since the piece sacrifice 10.0-0 is dubious on account of 10...cxd5 11.exd5 Be7! If White instead plays 6.exd5, the light-square bishop is blocked and after 6...Nf6 7.Nc3 Bd6 Black can complete development relatively easily.

The big advantage of Göring's move order (Nf3 before c3) is avoiding Schlechter's Defence, since after 1.e4 e5 2.Nf3 Nc6 3.d4 exd4 4.c3 dxc3 5.Bc4 cxb2 6.Bxb2 Black cannot safely play 6...d5 with the queen's knight committed to c6. Another advantage of the Göring move order is that the computer-inspired Qe7 in response to c3 is now too slow as White can castle and achieve a pin on the queen if Black proceeds the same way. The big advantage of 2.d4 exd4 3.c3 is the option to meet 3...d5 with 4.exd5 Qxd5 5.cxd4 Nc6 6.Be3 instead of 6.Nf3 transposing to the Göring Gambit Declined (the main objection being the Capablanca Variation, 6.Nf3 Bg4 7.Be2 Bb4+ 8.Nc3 Bxf3 9.Bxf3 Qc4, when White must exchange queens or give up castling). It also has the advantage of avoiding Black's other options after 2.Nf3, mainly 2...Nf6 (the Petrov Defence).

== See also ==
- List of chess openings
- List of chess openings named after places
- Israel Albert Horowitz § Horowitz Defense
