= Nakskov =

- Town
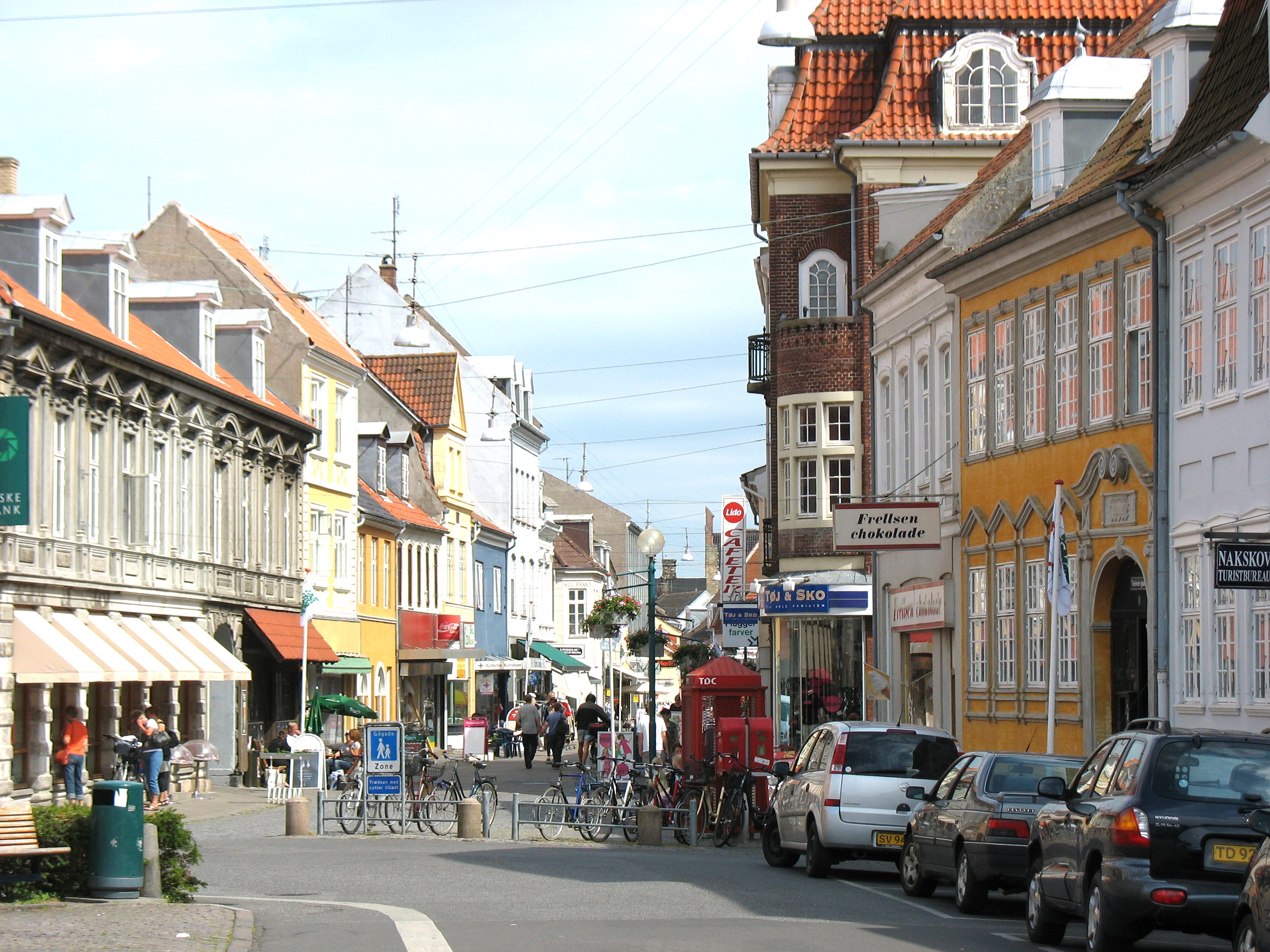
- Nakskov town centre

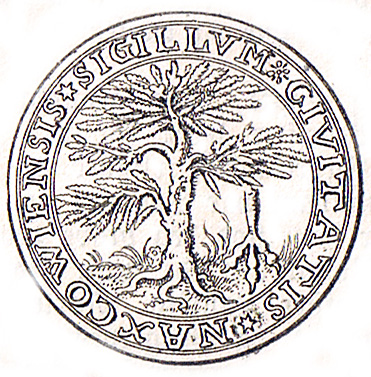
- Seal Coat of arms

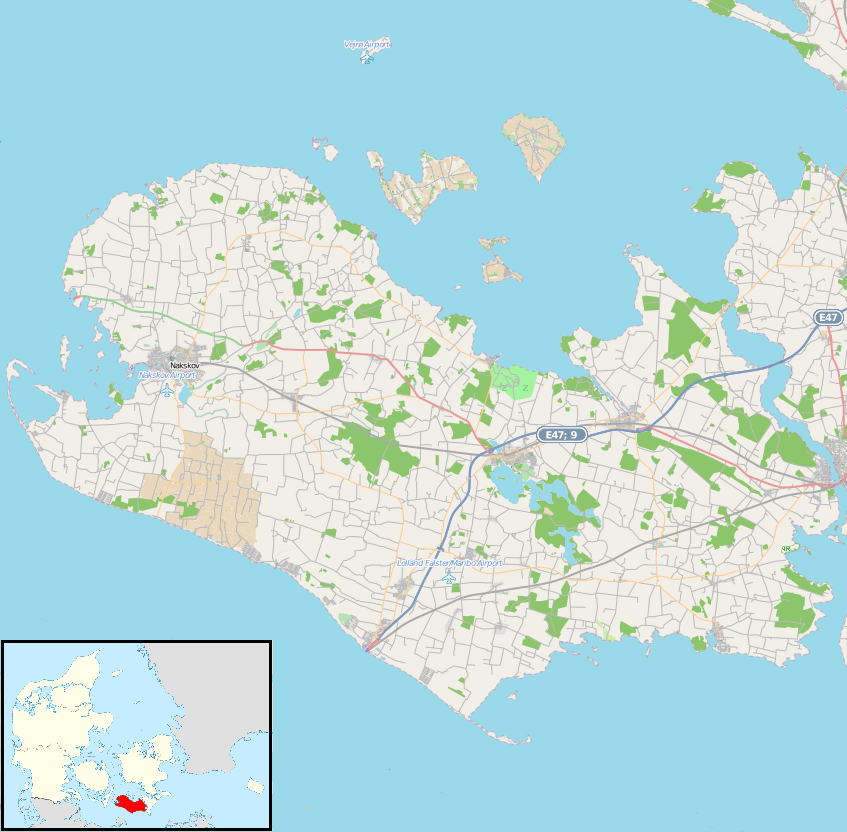
- Location on Lolland Nakskov (Denmark Region Zealand) Nakskov (Denmark)
- Coordinates: 54°50′00″N 11°09′00″E
- Country: Denmark
- Region: Zealand (Sjælland)
- Municipality: Lolland

Area
  - Urban: 8.71 km^{2} (3.36 sq mi)

Population (2026)
  - Urban: 11,969
  - Urban density: 1,370/km^{2} (3,560/sq mi)
  - Gender: 5,837 males and 6,132 females
- Demonym: Nakskovit
- Time zone: UTC+1 (CET)
  - Summer (DST): UTC+2 (CEST)

Nakskov is a market town on the island of Lolland in south Denmark. The town has a population of 11,969 (1 January 2026) and is the largest town on the island of Lolland. It is located in Lolland municipality in Region Sjælland.

Nakskov is situated on the western coast of the island of Lolland, one of the agriculturally richest of the Danish islands. It lies adjacent to the inner part of the Nakskov Fjord, an inlet from the Langeland Belt (Langelandsbælt) that runs between the islands of Lolland and Langeland. Nakskov Fjord is a wildlife reserve, known for its bird life. Nakskov is one of the most environmentally conscious and cleanest towns of Denmark. Technological and environmental enterprises have replaced the earlier heavy industries, and in recent years, local government has restored the town.

== History ==
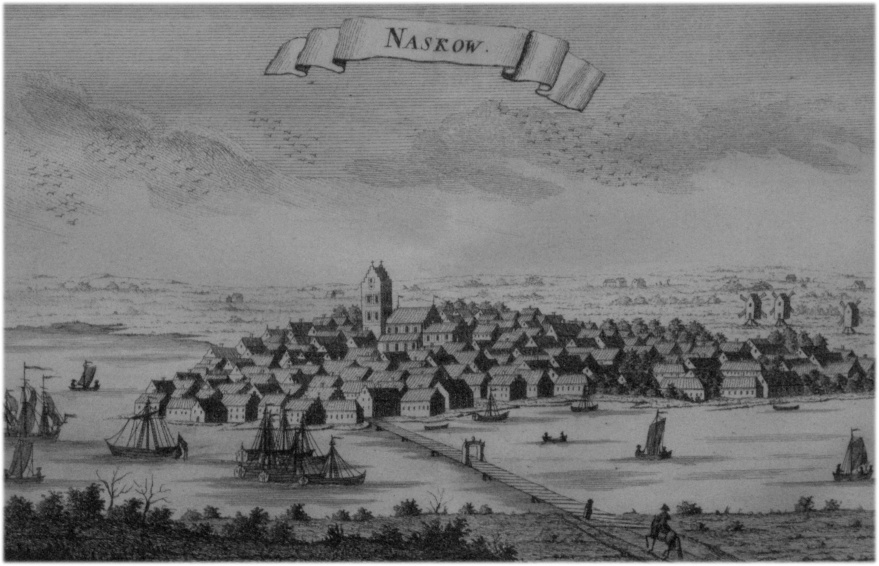
Copper plate illustration of the town of Nakskov, Denmark, probably 17th century, seen from the south across the strait separating the inner and outer portions of the fjord.

The area of the current town of Nakskov was settled during the Neolithic period and has been continuously inhabited since. The town received trade privileges in 1266, during the reign of king Erik V Glipping. Once the export center of western Lolland, Nakskov thrived on trade, commerce and industry. This changed gradually as overland traffic was enabled by a railway to the neighboring island of Falster in 1875. The connection to Sjælland and Copenhagen over the Storstrømsbroen bridge in 1937 shifted goods from the port of Nakskov. Over time, several industries and factories opened in the town, amongst them the sugar factory in 1882, and the shipyard in 1916.

Although traditionally a center of manufacturing and industry, when Denmark joined the EEC in 1973 and the subsidies were dismantled, it caused the industrial boom in shipbuilding to end. Subsequently, Nakskov turned to commerce and trade, and technological and environmental enterprises replaced the earlier heavy industries.

== Economy ==
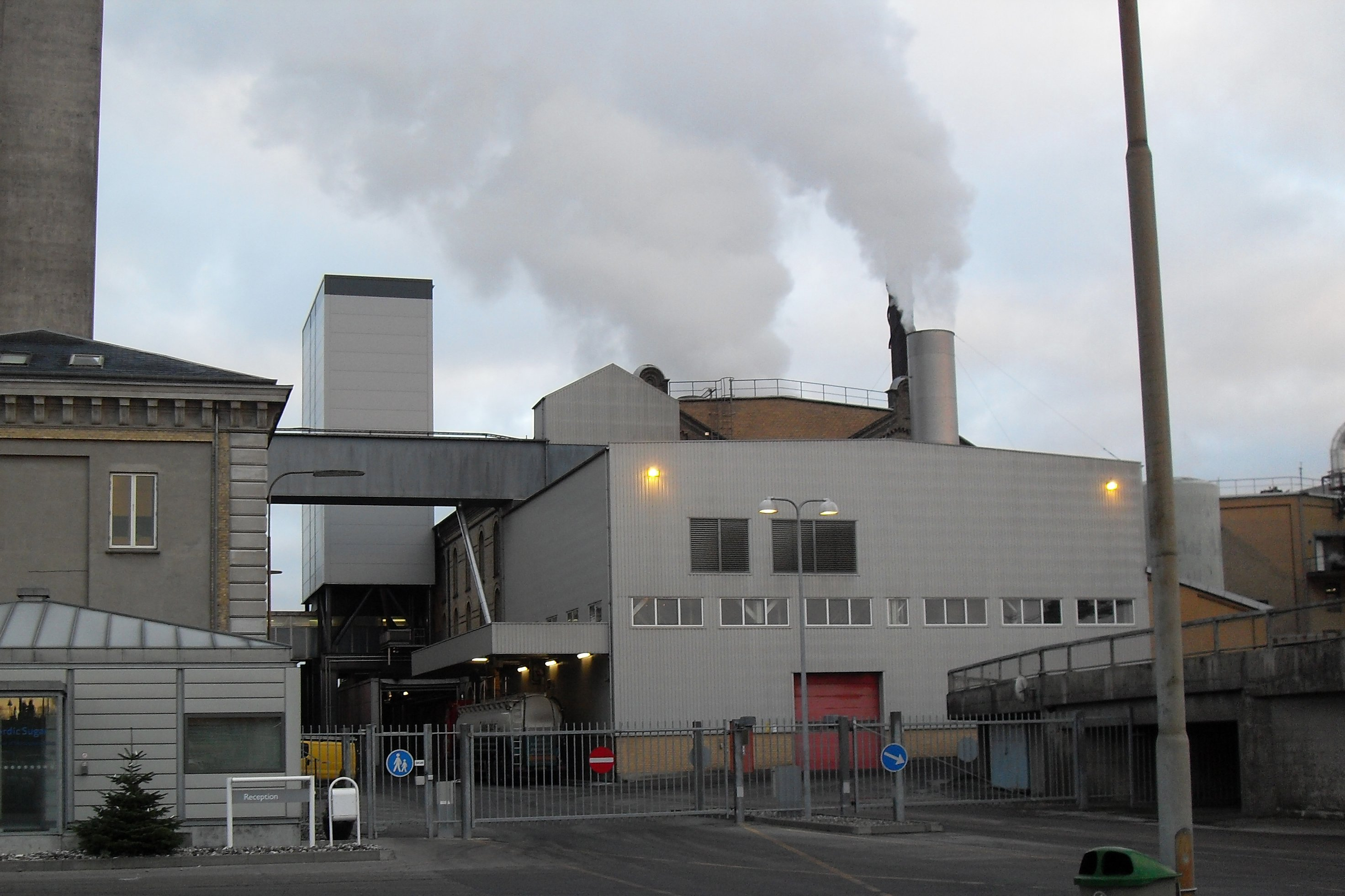
Entrance of the sugar factory in Nakskov.

Denmark's largest sugar factory is located in Nakskov. It processes about 12,000 tons of sugar beet per day and belongs to the German group Nordzucker.

== Nakskov municipality ==
Until 1 January 2007, "Nakskov" was also the name of a municipality (Danish, kommune) covering an area of 33 km^{2} (13 sq mi), and with a total population of 14,745 (2006). Nowadays Nakskov is integrated into, and encompassed by, Lolland municipality. The last mayor of Nakskov was Flemming Bonne Hansen, a member of the Socialist People's Party (Socialistisk Folkeparti) political party. Nakskov municipality ceased to exist as the result of Kommunalreformen ("The Municipality Reform" of 2007). It was merged with Holeby, Højreby, Maribo, Ravnsborg, Rudbjerg and Rødby municipalities to form the new Lolland municipality. This new municipality consists of an area of 892 km^{2} (344 sq mi) and a total population of 48,634 (2007).

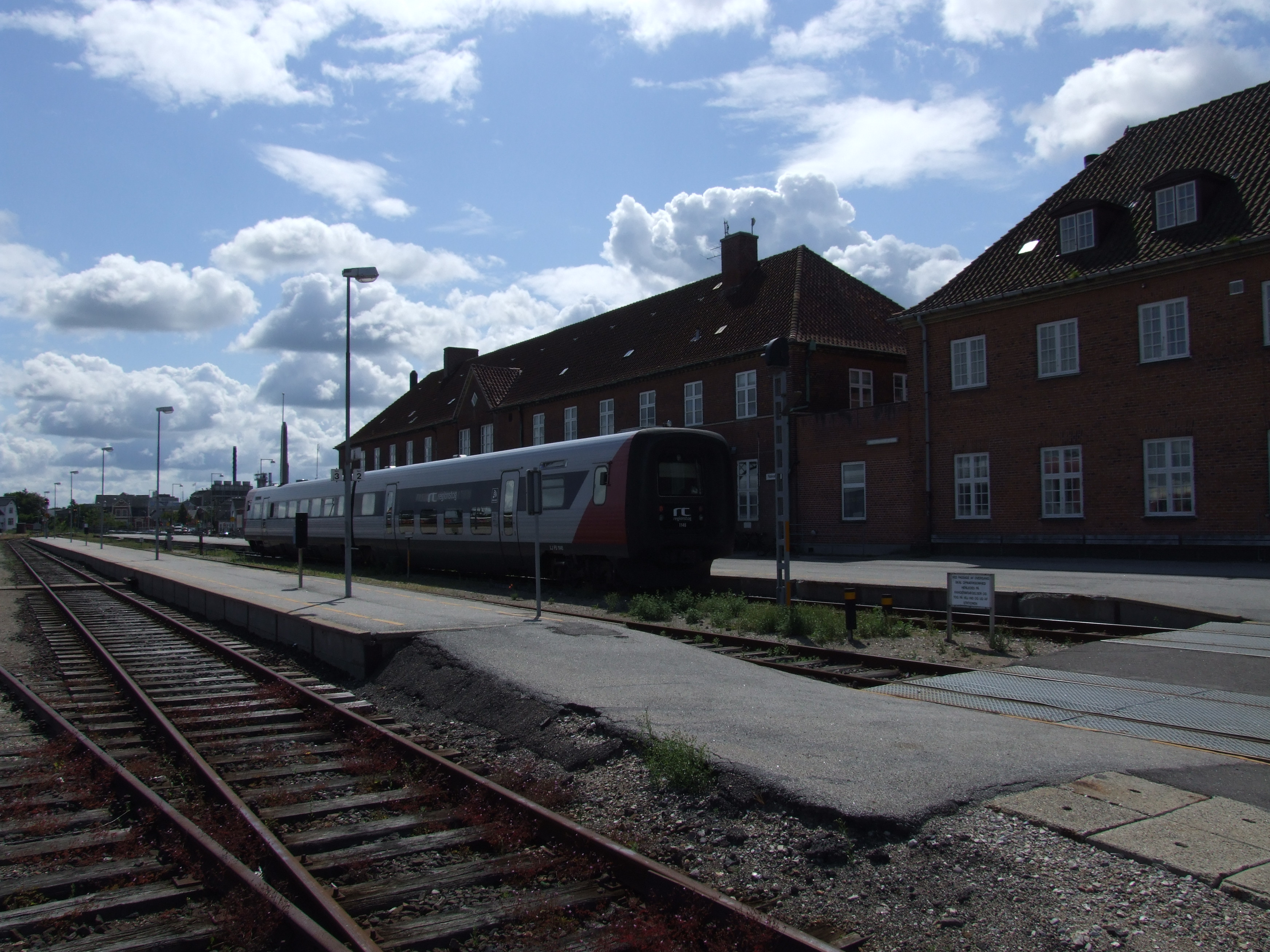
Nakskov railway station

== Transport ==
Nakskov is served by Nakskov railway station which is connected to Nykøbing Falster and the rest of the Danish rail network by the Lollandsbanen railway line. Busses run within the town and to neighbouring towns, villages and areas. Bike routes follow the levees encompassing the island of Lolland.

Boats run from Nakskov to the islands of the Nakskov Fjord (Slotø, Vejlø, Enehøje, and Albuen). At Tårs, a short distance to the northwest of Nakskov, a car ferry across the Langeland Belt connects Nakskov to Spodsbjerg on the island of Langeland. Danish national road 9 between Odense on Funen and Nykøbing Falster on Falster passes by Nakskov.

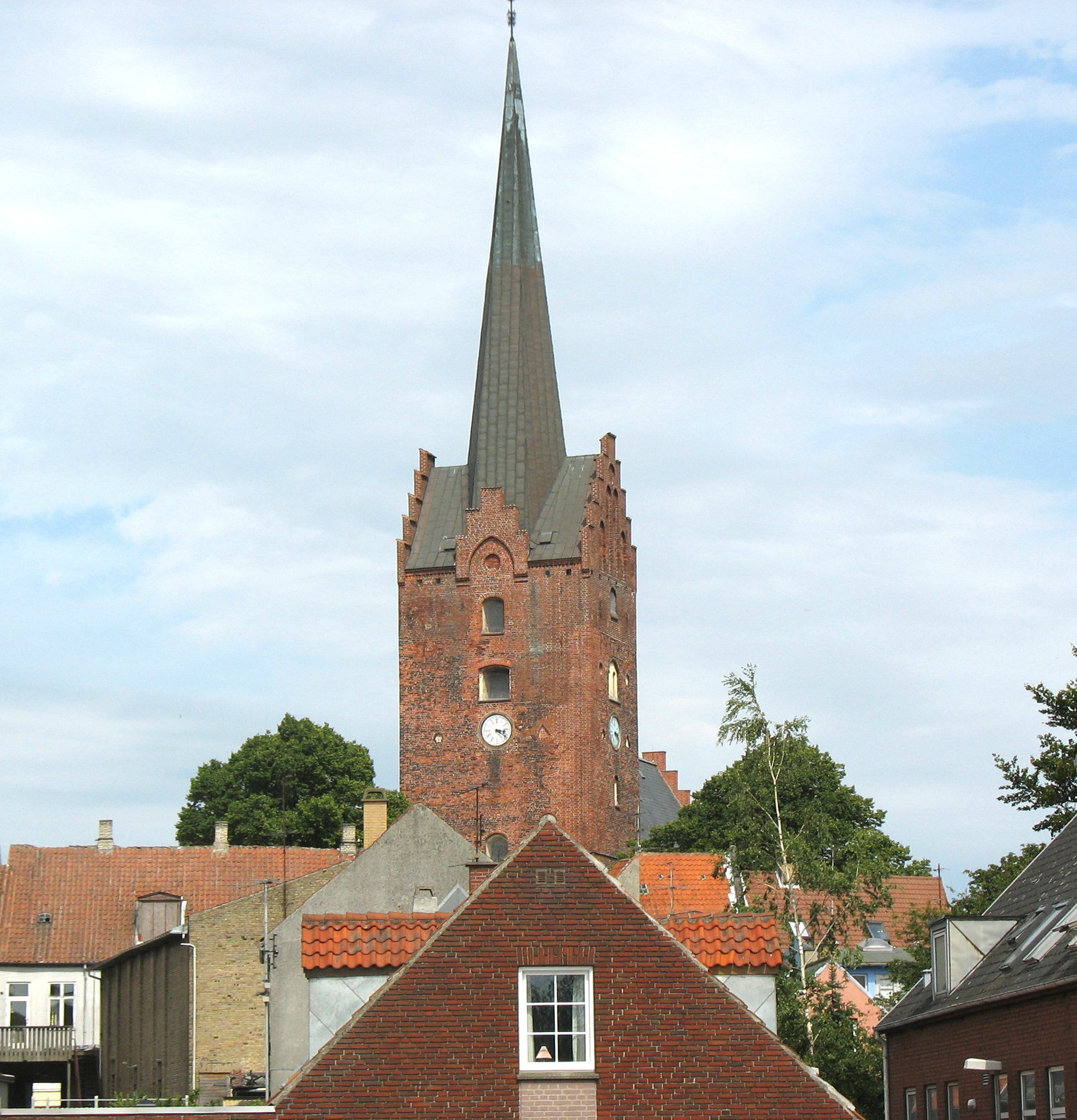
Nakskov Church

== Attractions ==
Nakskov Church, dating to the early 13th century, has carved works from the Baroque period including the pulpit (1630) by Jørgen Ringnis and the altarpiece (1656) by Anders Mortensen.

Large parts of the wetlands around Nakskov were drained in the 19th century. The levee along the southern shore of the fjord allows to travel by foot or on a bicycle to Langø. Another attraction of Nakskov is the Danish sugar museum (sukkermuseum). The town also used to display an ex-Soviet submarine designated S-359 or U-359.

== Notable people ==
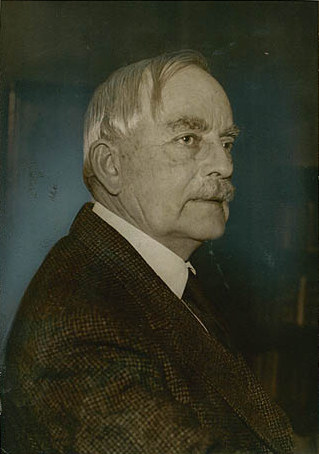
Johannes Wilhjelm, 1937

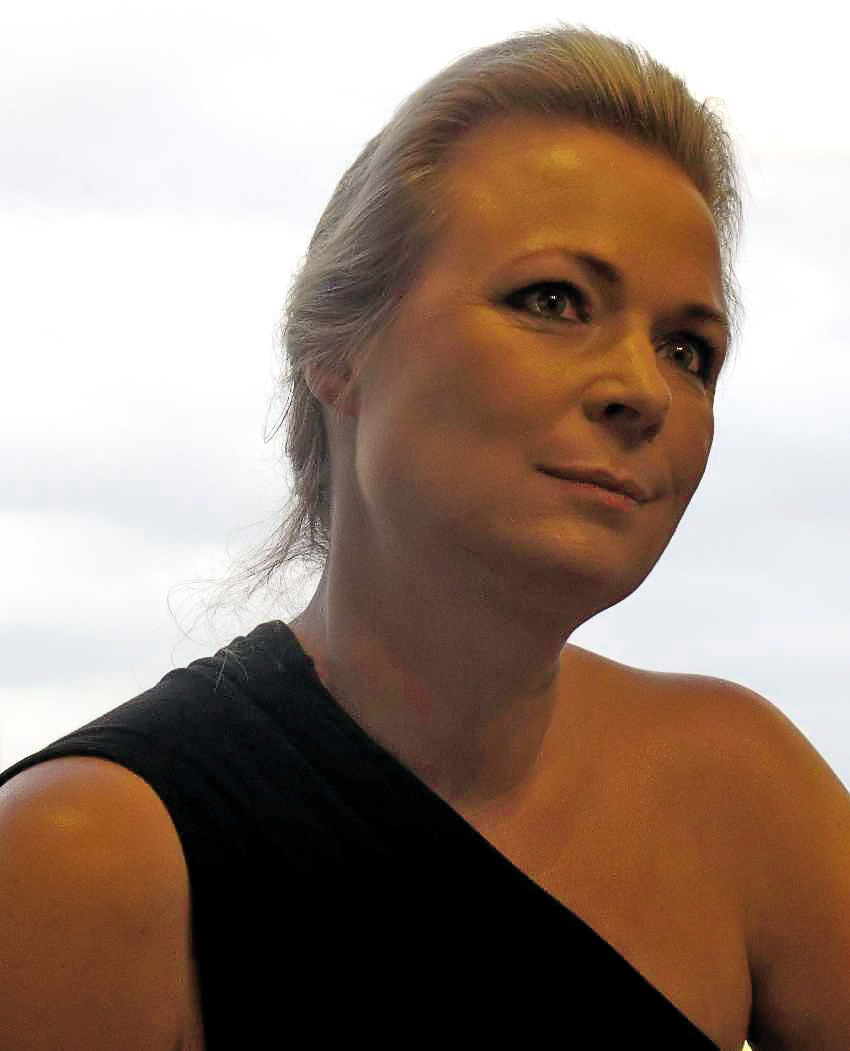
Helle Helle, 2012

- Jørgen Ringnis (?? - 1652 in Nakskov) a Danish woodcarver of altarpieces and pulpits
- Martin Severin From (1828–1895) soldier, civil servant and Danish chess master
- Hans Niels Andersen (1852–1937) a shipping magnate, businessman, founded the East Asiatic Company
- Ludovica Levy (1856–1922) a Danish actress, theatre director and theatre critic
- Johan Jensen (1859–1925) a Danish mathematician and engineer
- August Enna (1859–1939) a Danish composer, known mainly for his operas
- Johannes Wilhjelm (1868–1938) a Danish painter of bright, colourful landscapes
- Jørgen Skafte Rasmussen (1878–1964) a Danish engineer and industrialist
- Victor Cornelins (1898–1985) a Danish school teacher, musician, and public speaker.
- Paul Hagen (1920–2003 in Nakskov) a Danish film and television actor
- Per Mollerup (born 1942) a Danish designer, academic, and author
- Ole Kiehn (born 1958) a Danish-Swedish neuroscientist and academic
- Stefan Wenzel (born 1962) a German politician for the Alliance '90/The Greens
- Helle Helle (born 1965) a widely translated Danish short story writer and novelist
- Lisbeth Zornig Andersen (born 1968) a Danish economist, activist and author
- Blak (born 1989) a Danish rapper and songwriter; stage name of Henrik Blak
- Mette Jacobsen (born 1973) a Danish freestyle and butterfly swimmer, competed in five consecutive Summer Olympics from 1988

== Gallery ==
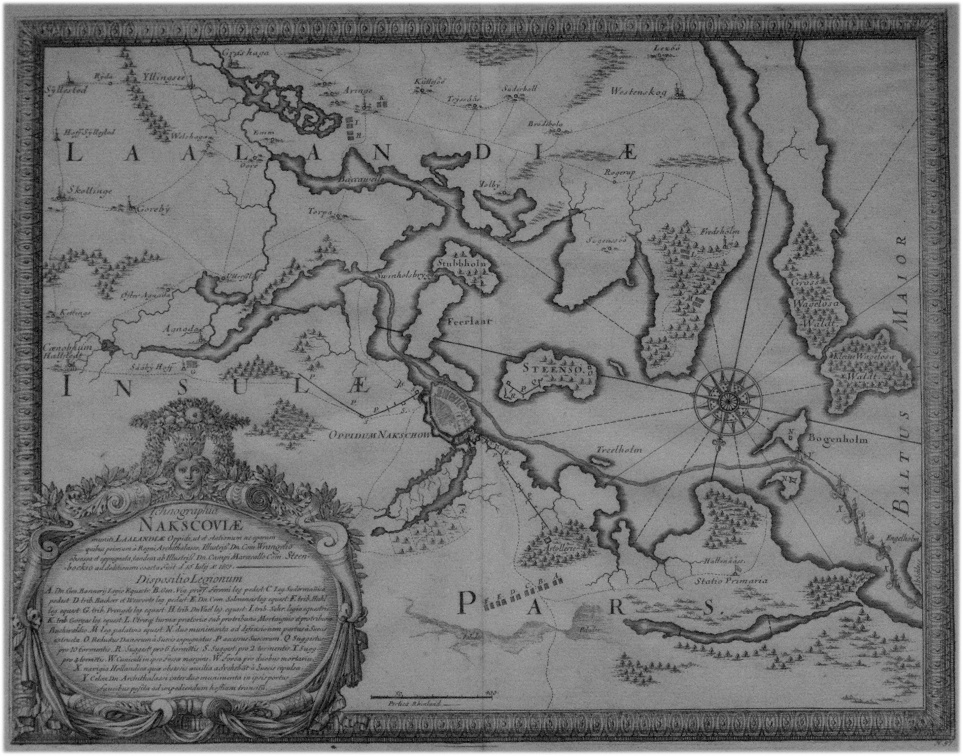
Nakskov and surrounding area (up = south) as depicted by the Swedish king's cartographer during the siege of Nakskov in 1658.

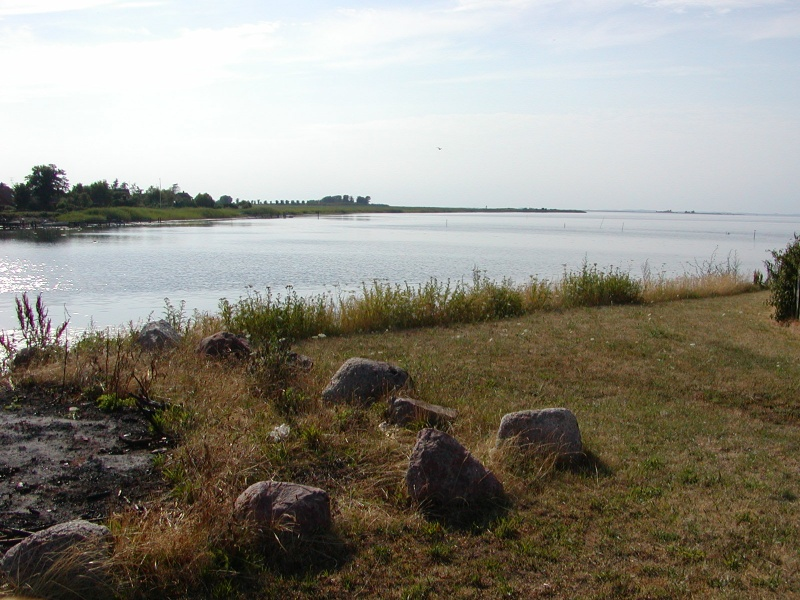
View from Langø in Nakskov Fjord toward the peninsula of Albuen and the island of Langeland in the west

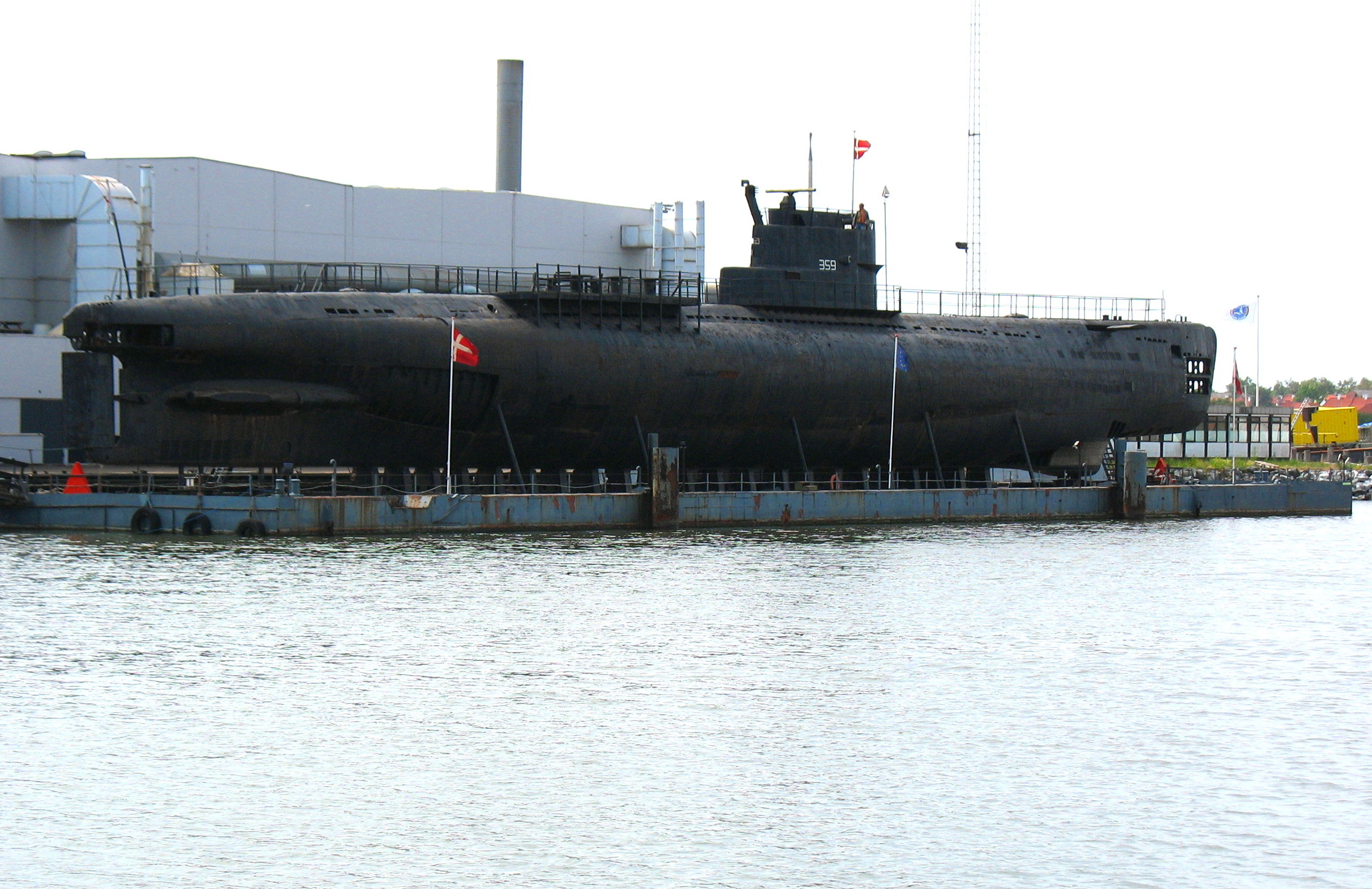
The formerly Soviet submarine S-174/U-359 in Nakskov harbor.

== See also ==
- Lolland Hydrogen Community
