= Helle Helle =

Danish short story writer and novelist

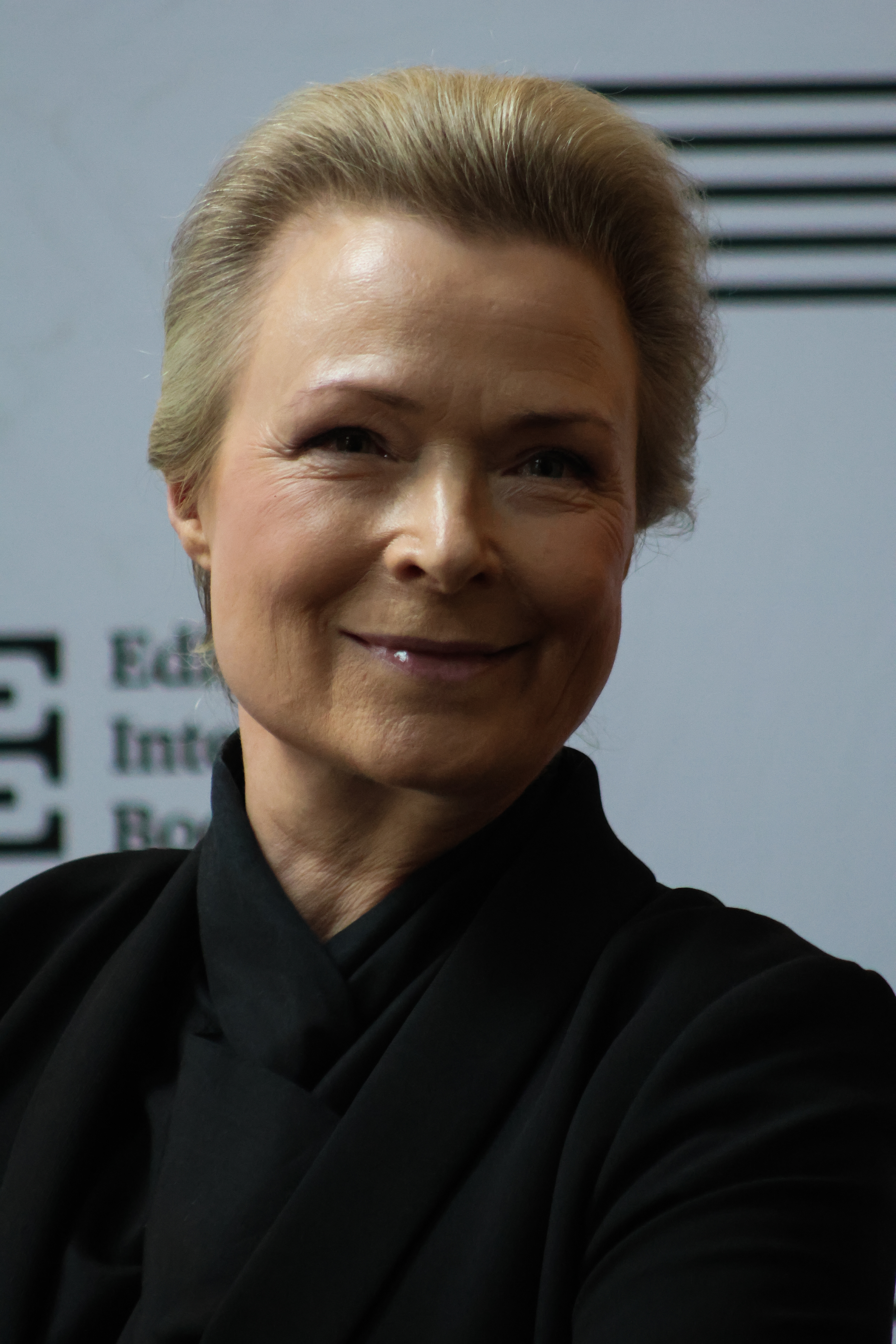
- Helle at Edinburgh International Book Festival 2026
- Born: December 14, 1965 (age 60); Nakskov, Denmark
- Writing career
- Language: Danish

Helle Helle (born 14 December 1965) is a widely translated Danish novelist. Basing her stories on episodes in the lives of ordinary people, she gained fame in 2005 with her novel Rødby-Puttgarden. Now considered to be one of the most outstanding authors of contemporary Danish literature.

== Early life and education ==
Helle was born on 14 December 1965 in Nakskov on the island of Lolland. Her name at birth was Helle Olsen. She lived in Nakskov until she was three, but after her parents divorced, she moved to the harbour town of Rødby where her name became Helle Hansen until her mother remarried and it was again changed to Helle Krogh Hansen.

In Rødby, she spent much of her spare time in the local library, increasingly gaining an interest in literature. After matriculating from Maribo Gymnasium in 1984, she spent a year selling perfume on the ferry from Rødby to Puttgarden which provided background for her later novel. She then went on to study literature at the University of Copenhagen from 1985–87.

After four of her early poems had been published in the journal Hvedekorn edited by Poul Borum, she decided to continue her studies from 1989 to 1991 at Copenhagen's Forfatterskolen, Borum's writing school. It was at this time that she adopted her grandmother's family name Helle as she thought the repeated Helle would serve her well as a writer.

== Writing career ==
In 1989, she realized she should concentrate on prose rather than poetry. This led in 1993 to her first book, Eksempel på liv (Example of Life), an experimental collection of short fragments of text providing glimpses into the lives of people who live a lonely isolated existence hidden in their rooms. Thereafter she began to write short stories in a succinct level of language, evoking the difficulties people experience in communicating with each other Her first collection was Rester (Remains, 1996) in which the title story evokes the remains of what could have become successful relationships. It was followed in 2000 Biler og dyr (Cars and Animals) where a meeting with death plays a central role.

Her novel Hus og hjem (House and Home, 1999) tells of how a woman returns to her childhood town, attempting to create a home for her lover. It is not clear whether she succeeds as she wastes most of her time watching television or gossiping with friends. In 2002, her Forestillingen om et ukompliceret liv med en mand (The Idea of an Uncomplicated Life with a Man) is centred on the difficulties a housewife has experienced with her lover, a writer, whom she discovers dead at the beginning of the book.

Helle's most successful novel to date has been Rødby-Puttgarden (2005) in which two sisters working in the perfume sales section of the ferry from Denmark to Germany recall the story of their dead mother. Bogged down in their concern with the past, they seem unable to progress with their lives. It was followed in 2008 by Ned til hundene (Down to the Dogs) about a woman who abandons her former life and is picked up by a couple who try to help her, assigning repetitive tasks for her. It brings out the humdrum routine of uneventful life in the provinces and the slowly evolving relationships between the three main characters.

Dette burde skrives i nutid (This Should be Written in the Present Tense) published in 2011 is the first work in which Helle introduces incidents from her own life in that the main character, Dorte Hansen, has a background that is quite similar to her own. It is the story of a student in Copenhagen who spends more time with her boyfriend than at the university. The story also goes back to Dorte's earlier experiences and relationships with men in various parts of southern Zealand. The novel has no real plot but once again the uneventful lives of ordinary people in the provinces are presented in some detail. In 2014, this became the first of Helle's novels to be published in English.

Published in 2014, Helle's most recent novel Hvis det er (If You Want) presents a chance encounter between two joggers who meet in the woods somewhere in Jutland. They spend the night together in a cabin, trying to keep each other warm. For the first time, it is the man who tells the story in the first-person narrative. Again, there is virtually no plot, the interest revolving around the reactions and evolving relationship between the two characters.

== Awards and assessment ==
Among her many awards and prizes, Helle has received Kritikerprisen (the Critics' Prize), P. O. Enquist-prisen (the Per Olov Enquist Award) and De Gyldne Laurbær (the Golden Laurel). In 2009, she was nominated for the Nordic Council Literature Prize for Ned til hundene.

Commenting on This Should Be Written in the Present Tense in the New York Times, Jonathan Russell Clark refers to Helle's "enchanting gifts as a storyteller" while emphasising the work's compelling immediacy. A short review of the same work at the Edinburgh International Book Festival labels Helle as "one of Denmark's most celebrated authors", describing the book as "an intimate, unique novel in which nothing much happens but each sentence is a work of art that captures a whole story in itself".

In Denmark too, Helle's work has been widely acclaimed. Writing in Berlingske, Peter Krogh Hansen gives Hvis det er six out of six stars, qualifying the author as "one of the very, very best" in contemporary Danish literature.

Her novel They, translated into English by Martin Aitken, was reviewed in The Guardian as "one of those novels where little is spoken but everything, by the end, gets said ... a book that begs the reader to slow down and take notice".

== Books ==
- Eksempel på liv (Example of Life), Lindhardt & Ringhof, 1993
- Rester (Remains), short stories, Samleren, 1996
- Hus og hjem (House and Home), novel, Samleren, 1999
- Biler og dyr (Cars and Animals), short stories, Samleren, 2001
- Forestillingen om et ukompliceret liv med en mand (The Idea of an Uncomplicated Life with a Man), novel, Samleren, 2002
- Rødby-Puttgarden, novel, Samleren, 2005
- Ned til hundene (Down to the Dogs), novel, Samleren, 2008
- Dette burde skrives i nutid (This Should be Written in the Present Tense), novel, Rosinante, 2011
- Hvis det er (If you Want), novel, Rosinante, 2014
- de (they), novel, Rosinante, 2018
- BOB, novel, Gutkind, 2021
- Hafni fortæller (Hafni Says), Gutkind, 2023
- Hey Hafni, novel, Gutkind, 2025
