= Victor Cornelins =

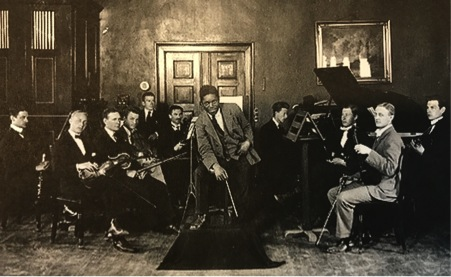
- A young Victor Cornelins, at the centre, during his time at Jonstrup Teacher College outside Copenhagen.
- Born: Victor Cornelius; 3 August 1898; Frederiksted, St Croix, Virgin Islands
- Died: 17 December 1985 (aged 87); Nakskov, Denmark
- Burial place: Avnede Church Yard; Lolland, Denmark
- Education: Jonstrup Seminarium
- Occupations: Teacher, musician, public speaker
- Known for: Subject of human exhibition in Denmark
- Spouse: Elvira Landén (m. 1924)
- Children: 3

Victor Waldemar Cornelins (3 August 1898 – 17 December 1985) was a Danish school teacher, musician, and public speaker. From birth named Cornelius, but due to a later misspelling in official papers after arrival to Denmark his name became Cornelins.

== From St. Croix to Denmark ==
Cornelins was brought to Denmark from St. Croix in 1905 when he was 7 years old. He ended up staying in Denmark becoming a respected and well-known public figure and teacher, in recent decades also generating new historical writing and portrayals of his life

== The Human Exhibition ==
Victor was born on the island of St Croix in Virgin Islands in 1898, at that time still under Danish colonial rule, which ended 19 years later when USA bought the islands during WWI, in 1917. When Victor was 7 years old he was transported to Denmark together with his half-sister, the then 4 year old Alberta Roberts (Alberta and Victor had the same father, but each a different mother), to participate as human exhibits in a colonial exhibition at the amusement park of Tivoli in Copenhagen. The organisers had easily found people from the Danish colonies of Greenland, Iceland and Faroe Islands. However, ticket sales were poor and the organisers, including the businessman Moses Melchior and the initiator, the writer and socialite Emma Gad, decided to try to add Black human subjects to the exhibition, thinking it would boost sales, as few people in Denmark had ever seen Black people in real life. The idea had first been to find a very presentable family; an adult Black couple engaged in making baskets and other handcrafts and ideally they should have small and pretty children. A woman who had come as housegirl 8 years before and a man named Smith who came with pigs, did not fit the bill the organisers thought. One source also notes that the idea had been to transport a man and a woman in one compartment of the ship, they could always get married underway, the organisers had pointed out. As a last attempt organiser Moses Melchior send his contact L.E.R. Ford in the West Indies a telegram saying: "Send two negro kids" (Send to Negerbørn). Ford succeeds. Two poor mothers each let a child go. Victor and Alberta are part of the exhibition for almost 2 months after they arrive 30 July. Victor did not want to stay in the open West- Indian pavilion and walks over to play with igloos and stuffed bears in the Greenland area. The organisers did not find the 'black Eskimo' appropriate, and decided to get a cave for both kids, avoiding Victor's constant running away. The audience were still very eager to touch the kids, sticking in fingers, offering chocolate etc. While Alberta said yes to the candy, Victor answered with spitting at audiences who got too close: "that was not very nice, but at that time I did not have other means to my disposal to keep up my dignity", Cornelins reflects on his spitting, in his autobiography. In the same autobiography he also tells about a reconciliation with a now elderly woman, who was a young girl in white dress, whom Victor had spat at in 1905.

== Family background and early life ==
He was born in Frederiksted, St. Croix, Virgin Islands. The father, Henry Cornelius, 1855–1903, was a craftsman and porter at St Croix and his mother, Sarah Eliza Allen, 1876–1943 (Freiesleben, 1998), came from St Martin to become a housegirl and part of a Danish-German church at St Croix in 1891. The father had around 50 children with numerous women. One of Victor Cornelins grandchildren, Ben Besiakov (a well-known Danish jazz musician) was during the early 2000s able to trace a Cornelins in almost every family on St. Croix. Henry Cornelius was moving around and Sarah Eliza was soon alone with small kids. Although she is poor she is according to Cornelins himself, in his autobiography, keeping the children well, going to church, sending the kids to Sunday school and is enjoying respect in the neighbourhood. This may again have led "to the attention from the Danes" when the kids had to be picked, Cornelins ponders in his autobiography and with grief his mother agrees to have one child sent away when she gets the offer. 19 years later, in 1924, Victor Cornelins now living in Nakskov, Denmark, marries Swedish Elvira Landén, and they have three children, Margit, Inger and Bengt.

== From human exhibit to teacher-musician: Adult life in Denmark ==
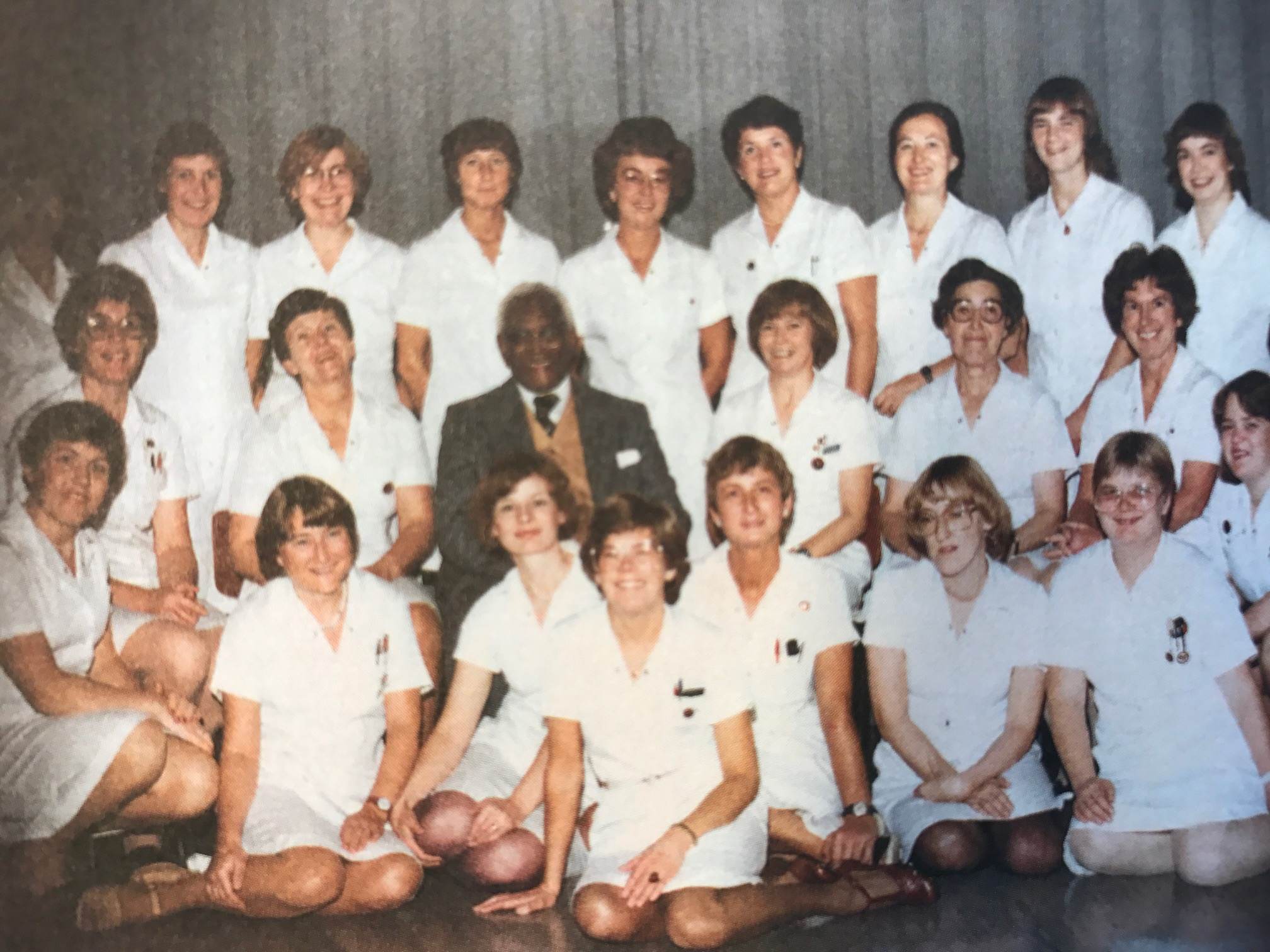
The late Victor Cornelins with the White Choir, composed of hospital workers

When the exhibition is over, the organiser Emma Gad wins a Royal medal for her work. Gad is in retrospect mostly famous in Denmark for her book 'Tact and Tone' on correct bourgeois behavior and interaction. In the preface, she lays out one key rule for human interaction: to act with a good heart. As Frank Larsen (not without sarcasm) notes: it is unclear how her good heart played a role when having two kids taken away from their families, sent across the ocean, to be put in a cave for others to look at, and harassed when walking through the city to and from the exhibition. However, Cornelins earns a place at a school for children without parents, Vajsenhuset, after the exhibition and after settling and performing well in school he is also allowed to attend teacher college after finishing secondary school. It is at this time Denmark sells the islands to the USA during WWI. The Americans are afraid that the enemy can use the islands as a base close to their border, so USA wants to get in control of the islands. There are discussions internally in Denmark whether Cornelins can stay or not which ends in Cornelins favour. He wants to stay and ends up doing so. After graduating from the Jonstrup Teacher College, Cornelins begins his 55-year teaching career at the island of Lolland, where he used to spend many of his summer holidays after arriving in Denmark. While life in the Copenhagen area was initially tough at his first caretaker mother, he has precious memories of his Lolland summer holidays at Lønstrupgård. On the island of Lolland he becomes a well known public figure and later also nationally known in radio shows with artists and intellectuals. He teaches at Nakskov Public school where he also becomes a deputy inspector and in addition he also leads the city's music school. During cancer treatment at Nakskov hospital after retiring, Cornelins picks up his harmonica and involves doctors and nurses in singing and dancing. This leads to the establishment of a White Choir. At his death bed in 1985 he hands over his harmonica to a former student, Ellis Nielsen, who continues the White Choir, and the idea spreads to other cities in the region where several other hospital choirs are formed (Section above extracted and summarised from Birgit Freiesleben, 1998, and Alex Frank Larsen, 2008).

Victor Cornelins only once, in 1970, returns to St Croix where he visits his mother's grave and the places he lived and used to play. He dies in 1985 in Nakskov, Denmark and is buried at Avnede Church Yard on the island of Lolland in Denmark. In the Summer of 2017 (100 years after Denmark sold the Virgin Islands) an exhibition about Victor Cornelins is to be launched at Nakskov Archive

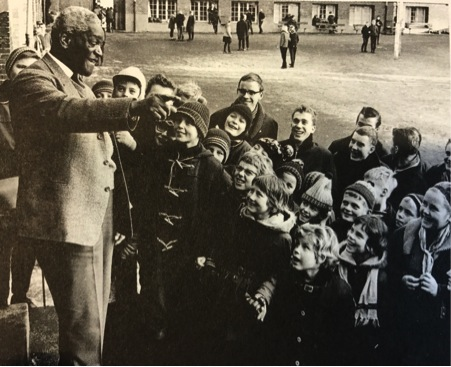
Victor Cornelins entertaining youngsters at his school in Nakskov, Denmark

== Sources ==
- Cornelins, Victor (1977) Fra St. Croix til Nakskov. Frimodts Forlag.
- Larsen, Alex Frank (2008) Slavernes Slægt. DRs forlag. The Chapter 'Tivolis sorte magnet'. A TV series on the same material was aired by DR/Denmarks Radio, Denmark's original Public Service broadcaster in 2005.
- Freiesleben, Birgit (1998) Fra St. Croix til Tivoli. En historisk betretning om to vestindiske børns lange rejse (This book is also available in English, with substantial parts of the autobiography included). Forlaget ACER
- Madsen, Henrik (2015) 'Fra St Croix til Nakskov' (Review of Cornelins autobiography) https://beldenak.wordpress.com/tag/victor-cornelins/. Visited Jan 2017.
- Munk-Nielsen, Karen Sivebæk (2008) 'Send to Negerbørn – Den dansk vestindiske lærer Victor Cornelins', in Julie Fryd Johansen et al. Skoler i Palmernes Skygge Odense: Syddansk Universitetsforlag.
- Purrup, Jette (2013) 'Negerbørn i Stauerby', in Bavnen:Vejlby-Strib Lokalhistoriske Forenings blad no. 1.
