= Soviet submarine U-359 =

Russian submarine acquired by a Danish project for unemployed youth

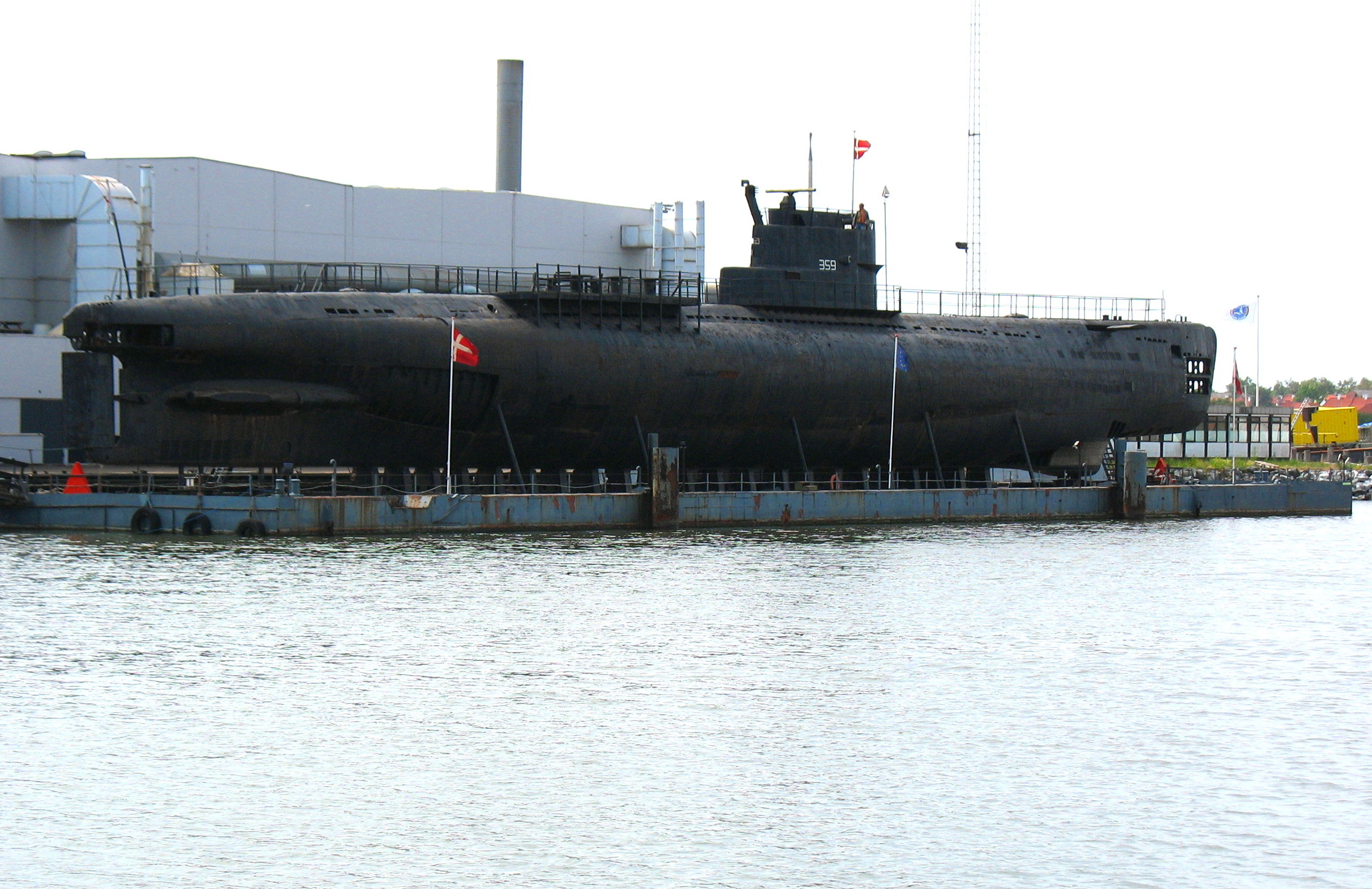
- U-359 as a museum ship in Nakskov in 2008.

History

Soviet Union
- Name: S-174, RZS-359,PZS-359
- Ordered: 1953
- Launched: 1954
- Completed: 1954
- Decommissioned: 1993
- In service: 1954
- Out of service: 1993
- Fate: Scrapped

General characteristics
- Class & type: Whiskey-class submarine
- Displacement: 1,080 long tons (1,097 t) surfaced; 1,350 long tons (1,372 t) submerged
- Length: 76 m (249 ft 4 in)
- Beam: 6.3 m (20 ft 8 in)
- Height: 11 m (36 ft 1 in)
- Draught: 4.8 m (15 ft 9 in)
- Propulsion: Diesel-electric
- Speed: 17 knots (31 km/h) surfaced; 13.5 knots (25.0 km/h) submerged
- Armament: 10 × 533 mm (21 in) torpedo tubes

Soviet submarine U-359 (originally named S-174, and later known as RZS-359 and PZS-359 before arriving in Denmark) was a Soviet Whiskey-class submarine built in 1953 and in service until 1993. After decommissioning, it was acquired by a Danish project for unemployed youth interested in turning it into a cultural site and tourist attraction.

== History ==
In 1991, a project for unemployed youth in Kolding, Denmark called The Rolling Gallery asked then Soviet President Mikhail Gorbachev to donate a submarine as a symbol of peace between the East and the West. The project proposed to use it as a cultural site and tourist attraction. Gorbachev agreed with the proposal, but it took three years and a payment of $110,000 to the Russian government before the vessel arrived in Kolding.

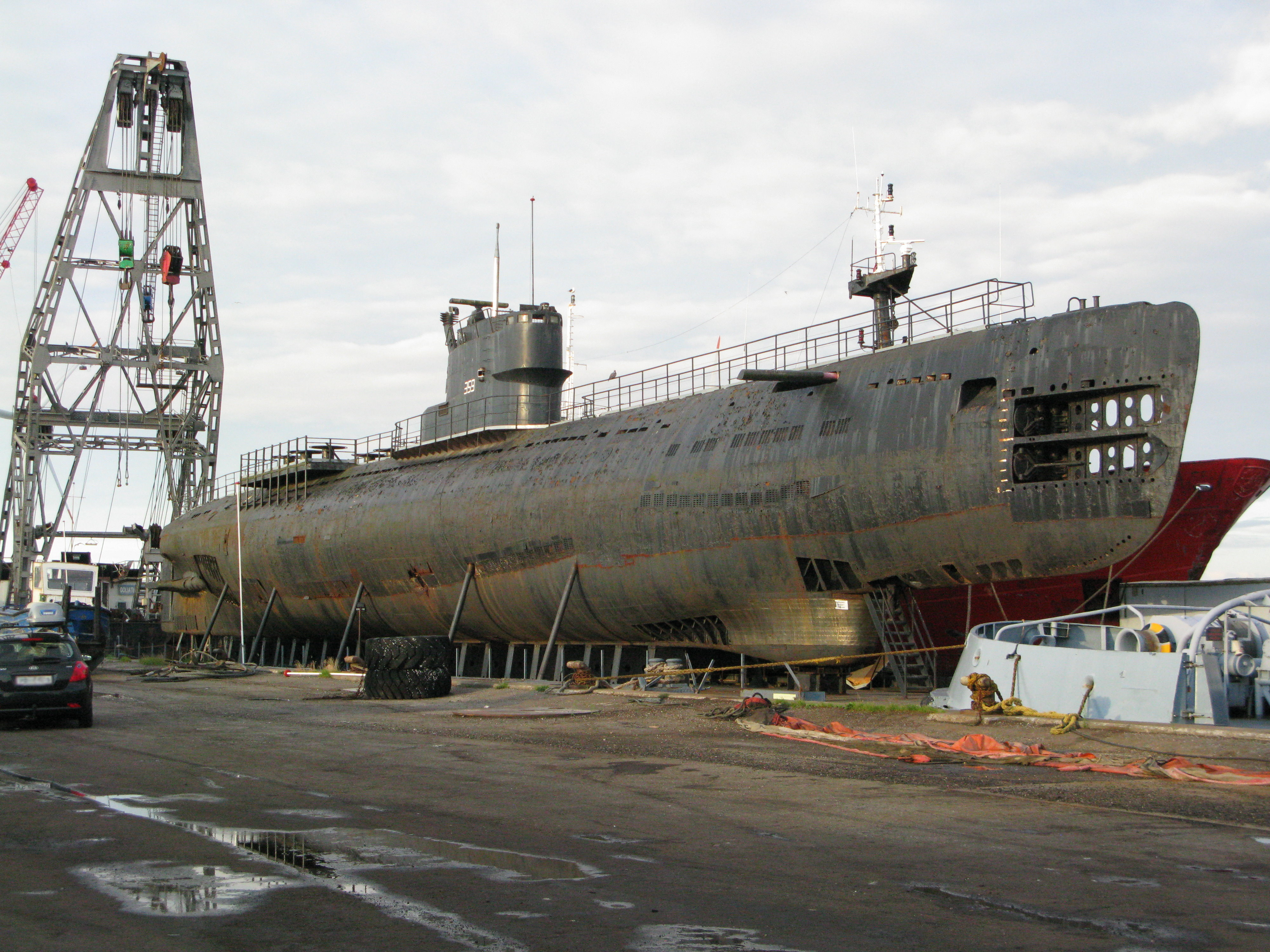
U-359 on the quay in Frederikshavn in 2011, ready for dismantling.

Residents were not happy with the having the submarine in the harbor, and after much debate and press coverage Kolding gave the submarine to the town of Nakskov in 1997. However, financial difficulties plagued the project and the plans for an experience center were not realized. The submarine fund attempted to move to Frederikshavn, but Nakskov would not cooperate. The sub served as a tourist attraction in Nakskov until 2010. In April 2011, it was towed to Fredrikshavn to be chopped up for scrap.

== Bibliography ==
- Friedman, Norman (1995). "Soviet Union 1947–1991: Russian Federation and Successor States 1991–". In Chumbley, Stephen (ed.). Conway's All the World's Fighting Ships 1947–1995. Annapolis, Maryland: Naval Institute Press. pp. 337–426. ISBN 1-55750-132-7.
- Pavlov, A. S. (1997). Warships of the USSR and Russia 1945–1995. Annapolis, Maryland: Naval Institute Press. ISBN 1-55750-671-X.
- Polmar, Norman & Moore, Kenneth J. (2004). Cold War Submarines: The Design and Construction of U.S. and Soviet Submarines. Washington, D. C.: Potomac Books. ISBN 978-1-57488-594-1.
- Polmar, Norman & Noot, Jurrien (1991). Submarines of the Russian and Soviet Navies, 1718–1990. Annapolis, Maryland: Naval Institute Press. ISBN 0-87021-570-1.
