= G. Halkier & Co. =

Danish trading house

G. Halkier & Co. was a trading house based in Copenhagen, Denmark. It was headquartered at Dronningens Tværgade 12. The company was founded by the writer Emma Gad's paternal grandfather and later continued by first her father and then her mother in a partnership with an uncle. It was later passed on to her brother Jacob Gotfred Halkier (1837-1917).

== History ==
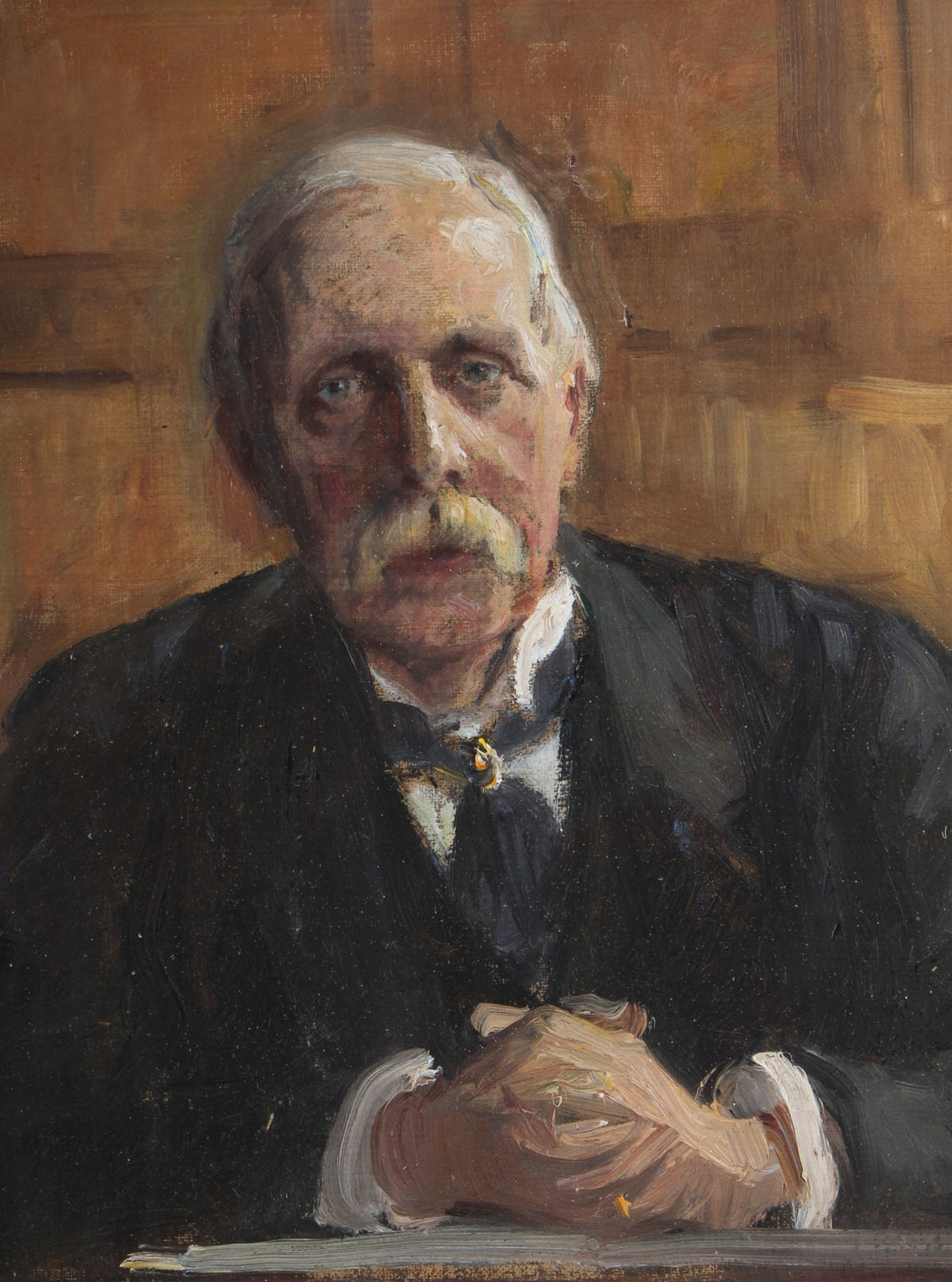
Knud Larsen: Jacob Gotfred Halkier, 1910

The company was founded in 1784 by Gotfred Halkier (1756-1812). In 1838, it was taken over by his sons Peter Andreas Halkier (1808-1859) and Nicolai Georg Halkier (1797-1880). Peter Andreas Halkier's share of the company was after his death taken over by his widow Edvarda Sophie Halkier (1816-1882) and in 1862 ceded to their son Jacob Gotfred Halkier (1837-1917). Jacob Gotfred Halkier's sister was the writer Emma Gad.

Jacob Gotfred Halkier was after his uncle's death in 1880 left as the sole owner of the company. His son Peter Ernst Harald Halkier was made a partner in 1900.
