= Martin Severin From =

Danish chess master

Personal information
- Full name: Martin Severin From
- Born: 8 April 1828 Nakskov, Denmark
- Died: 6 May 1895 (aged 67)

Chess career
- Country: Denmark

Martin Severin Janus From (8 April 1828 – 6 May 1895) was a Danish chess master known for creating From's Gambit. From's Gambit is a sharp response to Bird's Opening, requiring precision from both players.

== Personal life ==
Born in Nakskov, From received his first education at the grammar school of Nykøbing Falster. He entered the army as a volunteer during the Prussian–Danish War (Schleswig-Holstein War of Succession), where he served in the brigade of Major-General Olaf Rye and partook in the Battle of Fredericia on 6 July 1849.

After the war From settled in Copenhagen. He was employed by the Statistical Bureau, where he met Magnus Oscar Møllerstrøm, then the strongest chess player in Copenhagen. Next, he worked in the central office for prison management, and in 1890 he became an inspector of the penitentiary of Christianshavn. In 1891 he received the order Ridder af Dannebrog ("Knight of the Danish cloth", i.e. flag of Denmark), which is the second highest of Danish orders.

== Chess career ==
From won a chess tournament in Copenhagen 1862, followed by Magnus Oscar Møllerstrøm, Søren Anton Sørensen, Hans A. Lindehn, A. Mathiassen, and others. In 1865 he was elected President of Københavns Skakforening ("Copenhagen Chess Association"), today Denmark's oldest chess club, and held that position for many years. He tied for 12–13th in the Paris 1867 chess tournament, won by Ignatz von Kolisch.

== Death ==
In 1895 From died of cancer. He is interred at Vestre Cemetery, Copenhagen.

== Legacy ==
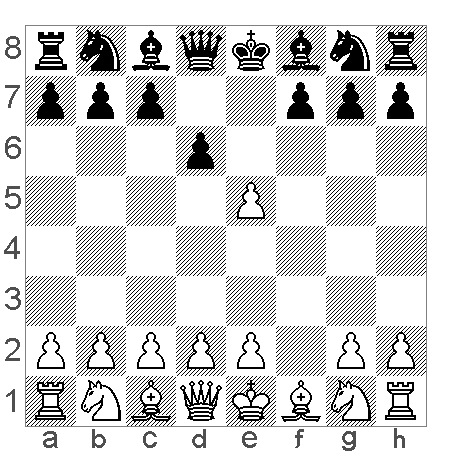
From's Gambit after 1...e5 2.fxe5 d6

He essayed the Danish Gambit (1.e4 e5 2.d4 exd4 3.c3) at Paris 1867, and he is usually given credit for the opening. His name is attached to From's Gambit in the Bird's Opening (1.f4 e5).
