= Emma Gad =

Danish writer, editor

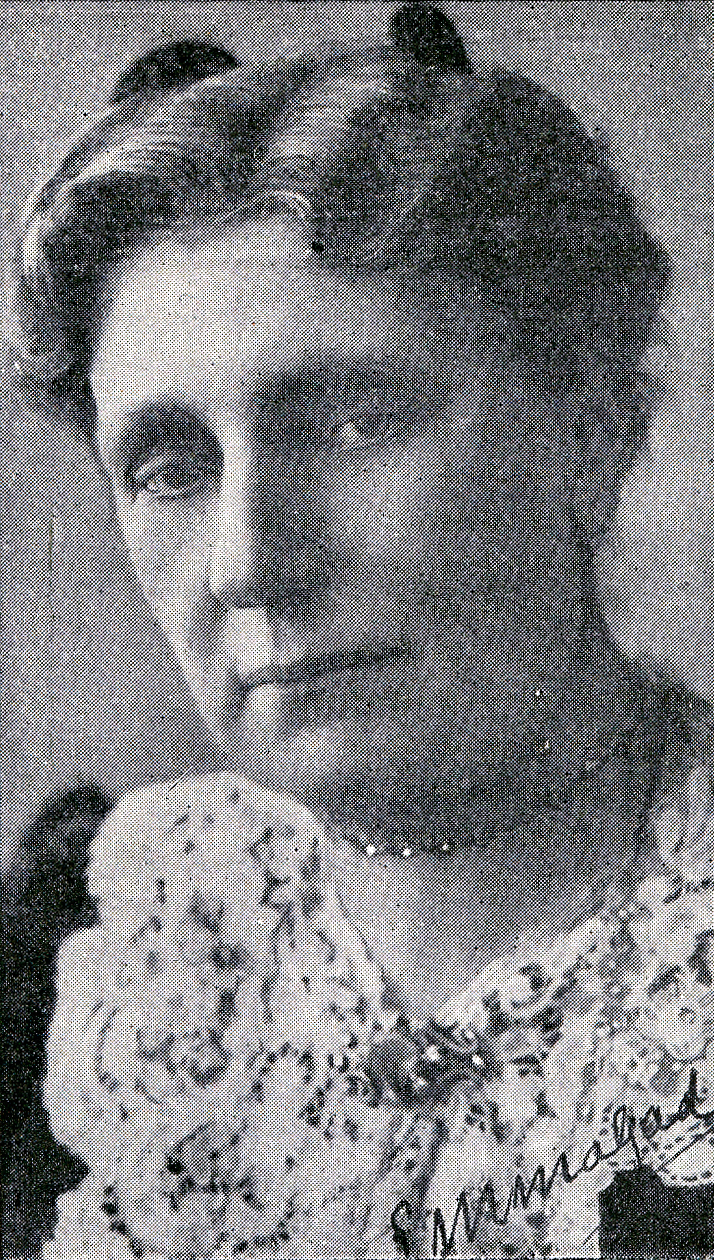
- Born: Emma Halkier; 21 January 1852; Copenhagen
- Died: 8 January 1921 (aged 68); Copenhagen
- Resting place: Cemetery of Holmen
- Occupation: Writer
- Spouse: Nicolas Urban Gad
- Children: Peter Urban Gad, Henry Urban Gad
- Writing career
- Language: Danish

Emma Gad (21 January 1852 - 8 January 1921), born Emma Halkier, was a Danish writer and socialite who wrote plays and books that were often satirical. Although she was a prolific writer, many of her works fell into obscurity after her death. One work that remained popular was Takt og Tone, a book of etiquette she wrote in old age.

She received a gold Medal of Merit in 1905. Today her plays are preserved in Denmark's Royal Library.

== Biography ==
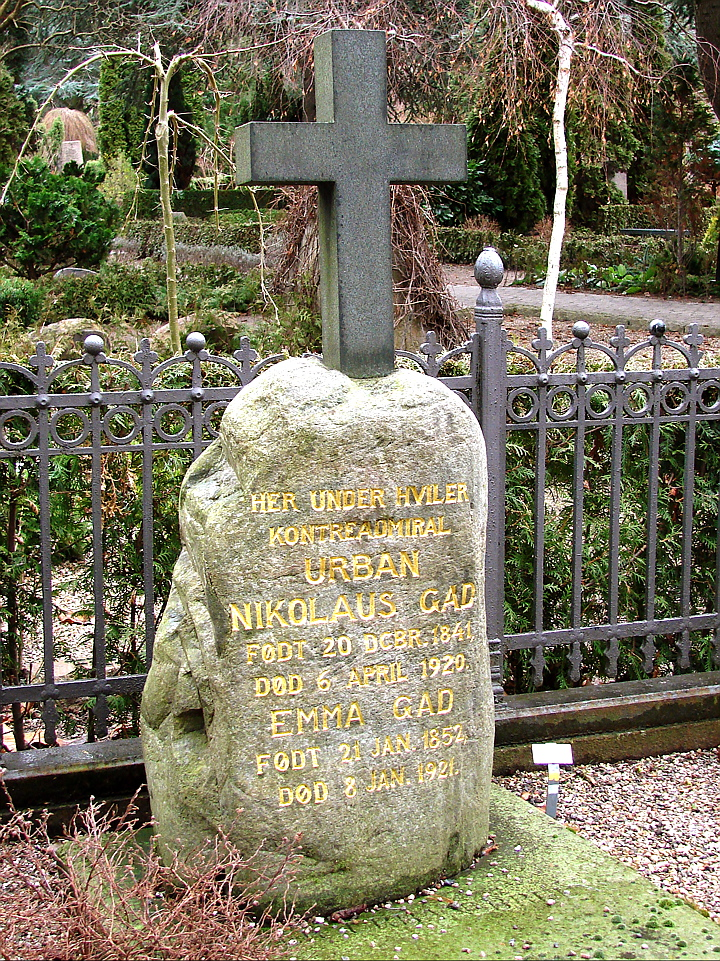
Gravestone of Emma and Nicolas Gad in Copenhagen

Gad grew up in a relatively affluent home in Copenhagen. Her father and uncle were the owners of the trading house G. Halkier & Co. She received a good education for a woman at the time and married Nicolas Urban Gad, a rear admiral, in 1872. They had two sons: Henry and Peter Urban Gad, who later became a filmmaker. She was a member of many trade unions and women's societies in Copenhagen, and her home was an important meeting place for intellectuals in Denmark at the turn of the century.

In 1886 she premiered as a dramatist at the Royal Danish Theatre's Ny Scene. In the mid-1890s, she was the driving force behind the successful 1895 Copenhagen Women's Exhibition. In 1898 she co-founded the Women's Trade and Clerical Association, which was the first professional organization of women in the office.

In 1905, Gad and the Danish Handicraft Association organized a "Colony Exhibition" at Tivoli Gardens, with Princess Louise as patron and Moses Melchior as president. It was Gad's intent to display an adult Black couple from the Danish West Indies. Due to being unable to persuade any adults to undertake the voyage, a decision was made to bring Black children to Denmark for the exhibit. Sarah Eliza Allen, an impoverished West Indian woman, consented to her 6 year old son Victor Cornelins being sent to Copenhagen in 1905. A 5 year old girl Alberta was also sent. Both children remained in Denmark for the rest of their lives. Alberta died of tuberculosis at a young age, while Victor went on to become a well-known educator.

== Etiquette - About Dealing with People ==
Gad's book Etiquette - About Dealing with People (Danish: Takt og Tone - Om Omgang med Mennesker) was published in 1918. Her oft-repeated point is that when visitation is between considerate people then "etiquette" is not necessary. It is the indifferent, selfish, or directly ruthless people that create the need for a formal etiquette.

== Legacy and memorials ==
Emma Gads Vej, a street in Ørestad, Copenhagen, is named after her. On 21 January 2013 Google made a doodle for Emma Gad's 161st birthday, in honor of her book of etiquette.
