= Specialisterne =

Danish social innovation employment company

- Formation: 2004; 22 years ago
- Founder: Thorkil Sonne
- Region served: Brazil; Canada; Denmark; Iceland; Ireland; Italy; Latin America; Northern Ireland; Portugal; Spain; United States
- Website: https://specialisterne.com/

Specialisterne (The Specialists) is a Danish social innovator company using the characteristics of neurodivergent people (including autism/Asperger's, ADHD, OCD, and dyslexia) as competitive advantages in the business market.

Specialisterne provides services such as software testing, quality control, metadata management, data conversion, and logistics, as well as in other areas such as agriculture, for businesses in 26 countries. In addition, Specialisterne assesses and trains people to meet the requirements of the business sector.

The company's branches, as well as the concept and name, are owned and operated by Specialisterne Foundation, with offices in 13 countries and local partnerships in others.

The company provides a working environment in which skills common to neurodivergent employees – such as pattern recognition, detection of deviations, attention to detail, and extended focus – are integral, and where the role of the management and staff is to create the best possible working environment for the employees with ASD.

== Background ==
The youngest son of Specialisterne founder Thorkil Sonne, Lars, was diagnosed as having "infantile autism, normal intelligence", at age three, denoting an Autism Spectrum Disorder (ASD). Sonne became active in the Danish Autism Association, then president of a local chapter of Autism Denmark, for three years, where he learned that people with ASD seldom have a chance to use their special skills in the labour market.

After 15 years working with IT within telecommunication companies, Sonne knew the value of the skills he saw in people with ASD. With the support of his family, Sonne founded Specialisterne in 2004, based on a home mortgage and his family's belief in his vision.

== Today ==
As of 2024, Specialisterne has over 600 employees and has operated in 26 countries, with offices in 13 of them: Australia, Brazil, Canada, Denmark, France, Iceland, India, Ireland, Italy, Mexico, Spain, the UK, and the United States. A 2017 report by the Organisation for Economic Co-operation and Development (OECD) stated approximately 75% of the company's 50 IT employees in Denmark had a diagnosis within the autism spectrum. The head offices are in Copenhagen. The company includes training programs to access and build up personal, social and professional skills for people with ASD – no formal education or job experiences are expected. A number of appropriate strategies are used for individuals on the spectrum, including LEGO Mindstorms robot technology, helping to detect the strengths, the motivation and the development opportunities of the individual.

Services offered by Specialisterne include software testing, quality control, documentation, data entry, and logistics with a high attention to detail and accuracy for customers including TDC A/S, Grundfos, KMD, CSC, SAP, Microsoft, Parexel, Hewlett-Packard, and Oracle.

Specialisterne maintains a focus on transferring knowledge on how to turn disabilities into abilities. Speeches, workshops and courses are based on the method of positive thinking called The Dandelion Model. (The dandelion was symbolically chosen as a beneficial weed found in unexpected places, akin to the ethos of ASD including valuable skills.)

In December 2008, Thorkil Sonne donated all shares of Specialisterne to the Specialist People Foundation (later Specialisterne Foundation), a nonprofit organization founded by Sonne.

In September 2009, Specialisterne started a school where youth with ASD could get an education with focus on social development and interaction with its offices. The school is funded with help from the Lego Foundation and the Danish Ministry of Education.

In August 2010, Specialisterne opened in Scotland with David Farrell-Shaw as general manager. The Scottish company was a subsidiary of the social enterprise company Community Enterprise in Scotland (CEiS), funded by £700,000 from the Scottish government; the project also received £407,036 from the Big Lottery Fund and £30,000 from Glasgow City Council.

In October 2010, assisted by funding support from a European Commission's Lifelong Learning Programme called the Leonardo da Vinci programme (project number 2010-1-IS1-LEO05-00579), a project began to link Scotland, Denmark, Germany and Iceland. The Icelandic offering went live in January 2011.

In September 2012, Specialisterne Scotland closed, and a branch opened in the US called Specialisterne Minnesota. The following year, the Minnesota organization became Specialisterne USA, based in Delaware, and the company also opened an office in Canada. An Australian branch was founded in 2015, which then formed a partnership with the Dandelion Program and, in 2017, announced plans to form a partnership in New Zealand. The same year, a branch was founded in Milan, Italy. It has also opened branches in a number of other countries. A similar organisation in the United States, Aspiritech, is based on the same concept.

== See also ==
- auticon
