= Hans Anton Lindehn =

Swedish-American teacher, journalist

Hans Anton Westeson Lindehn (born February 23, 1826, in Knislinge Parish; died July 9 or 10, 1884, in Philadelphia) was a Swedish-American teacher, journalist, and chess player.

== Biography ==
Lindehn was the son of the bell-ringer Hans Westesson. He became a student at Lund University in 1843, and in 1853 he earned a Bachelor of Arts and Doctor of Philosophy there. From 1854 to 1859, he studied at Uppsala University. Between 1866 and 1870, he ran the private elementary school Lyceum in Gothenburg. He was involved in real estate transactions but went bankrupt in 1870. His school was incorporated into the Gothenburg Lyceum. After a period in Stockholm, where he supported himself as a journalist, he emigrated to the US in 1873, from where he sent correspondences to Swedish newspapers. In the 1850s, Lindehn made a name for himself as one of Sweden's foremost chess players, alongside Severin Bergh. During his travels in England, France, Germany, and Belgium from 1861 to 1865, he gained international fame by defeating some of the world's most skilled players, including MacDonnel, Kolisch, Wilhelm Steinitz, and others. From 1873 to 1877, he solidified his position as a prominent player through matches with American chess players such as Mackenzie, Delmar, and Elson. However, he never participated in any tournaments.
