= List of protected areas of Roskilde Municipality =

This list of protected areas of Roskilde Municipality is a list of protected areas of Roskilde Municipality, Denmark. It is based on a list compiled by the Danish Society for Nature Conservation. The list comprises all localities that are under landscape protection. For heritage listed buildings, see the list of listed buildings in Roskilde Municipality.

== List ==
Image	Locality	Size	Year	Coordinates	Description	Source
	Bolund	c. 20 hs	1941			Ref
	Boserup Skov and Kattinge Lakes		1964/1980			Ref
	Folkeparken	12 ha	1972			Ref
	Gadstrup Church					Ref
	Gundsømagle Lake	370 ha	1953/1956/1094			Ref
	Himmelev Strand	Ca. 0.37 ha	1926/1953			Ref
	Jyllinge Nordmark (Lønager Strandpark)	3.7 ha	1975			Ref
	Masterhøj		1918			Ref
	Oddestenskysten (Jyllinge Std and Odstenen)	C. 10.3 ha	1935/1977			Ref
	Provstevænget	C. 2ha	1929/1953			Ref
	Ramsødalen	C. 300 ha	2004			Ref
	Roskilde Fjord: Islands	c. 165 ha	1985			Ref
	Ryebakke		1962			Ref
	Ryebakke		1962			Ref
	Sankt Hans Hospital	C. 65 ha	1999			Ref
	SnoldelevHede					Ref
	Snoldelev Mose	C. 8.5 ha	1978			Ref
	Tjæreby Hede		1921			Ref
	Ågerup Dam	0.035 ha	1938			Ref
