= St Ib's Church, Roskilde =

Church in Roskilde, Denmark

Coordinates: 55°38′52″N 12°04′59″E

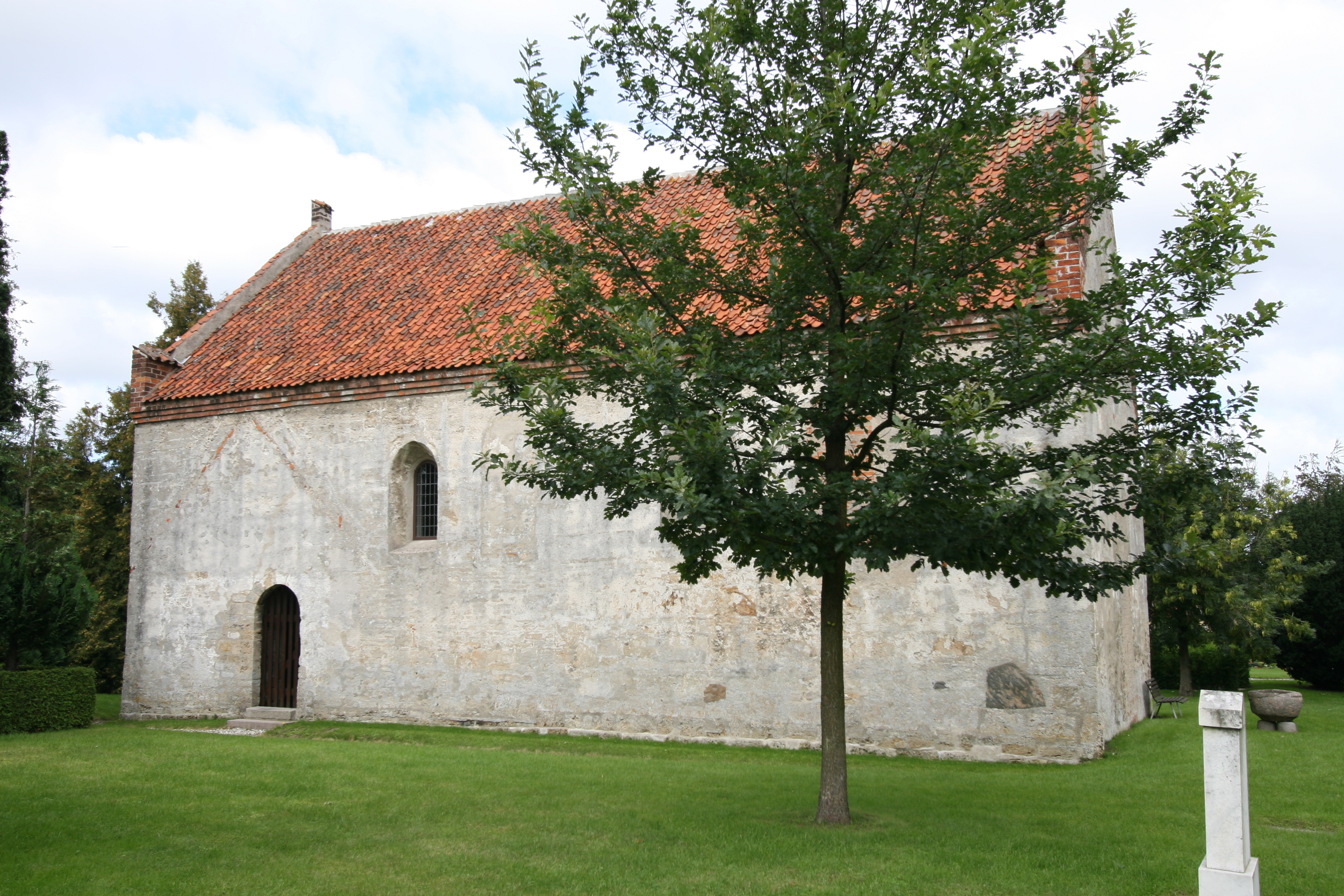
St Ib's Church

St Ib's Church (Danish: Sankt Ibs Kirke) is a Romanesque church in Roskilde on the Danish island of Zealand. It was first mentioned in 1291. The church was once richly decorated with frescos.

== History and architecture ==
Located on a small rise between Roskilde Fjord and the old town, the church is built on a site where there was originally a wooden church which was revealed in archaeological digs in the 1980s and 1990s. It is unclear when it was founded but it certainly existed in the 11th century. Between 1100 and 1150, the wooden church was pulled down to be replaced by a Romanesque stone church. It was built of travertine limestone in about 1100 and originally consisted of a nave and a chancel with flat ceilings, extending over a length of 22 m (72 ft). In the 13th century, six tall slender windows were added as well as a tower and a porch. The flat ceiling was replaced by vaults. St Ib's was a parish church until 1808 when the congregation moved to St Jørgenbjerg Church. During the Napoleonic Wars it was used as an infirmary for Spanish soldiers. It was sold to a merchant in 1815 who demolished everything but the nave which he used as a warehouse. The church was repurchased by the Diocese of Zealand in 1884 and was restored in 1922. Today the church, which is no longer functional, again has a flat wooden ceiling. The medieval part of the building was heritage listed in 1987.

== Interior ==
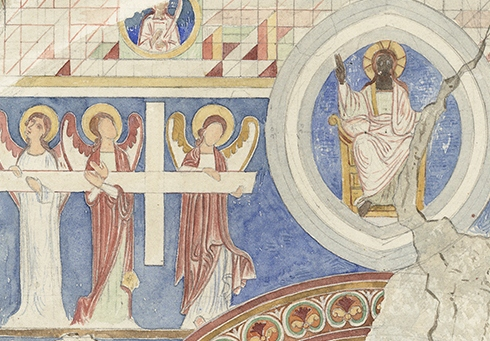
Jacob Kornerup: Watercolour depicting frescos in St Ib's Church

In the second half of the 19th century, Jacob Kornerup discovered traces of frescos from the 13th century, recording them as watercolours. The church had originally been richly decorated with wall paintings but only a few traces now remain on the rear wall.

The church's furnishings were removed in 1808 when the church was used to accommodate Spanish soldiers. Only the Romanesque granite font remains. It can now be seen to the east of the building.

== St. Ib's Graveyard ==
- Jens Otto Arhnung (1892-1968)n writer and historian
- Henry Christensen (1922-1972), politician and editor in chief
- Axel Marius Hansen (1877-1960), politician
- Max Harvøe (1921-1992), labour union leader
- Sigrid Kähler (1874-1923), ceramist and painter
- Anders Ring (1899-1948), silversmith
- L.A. Ring (1854-1933), painter

== See also ==
- Listed buildings in Roskilde Municipality
- List of churches in Roskilde Municipality

== Literature ==
- Danmarks Kirker, Københavns Amt, bind 1 (PDF) (in Danish). Nationalmuseet. 1944. pp. 58-97 (Hæfte 1).
