= Sankt Laurentii Church Tower =

Church in Roskilde, Denmark

Coordinates: 55°38′30″N 12°04′53″E

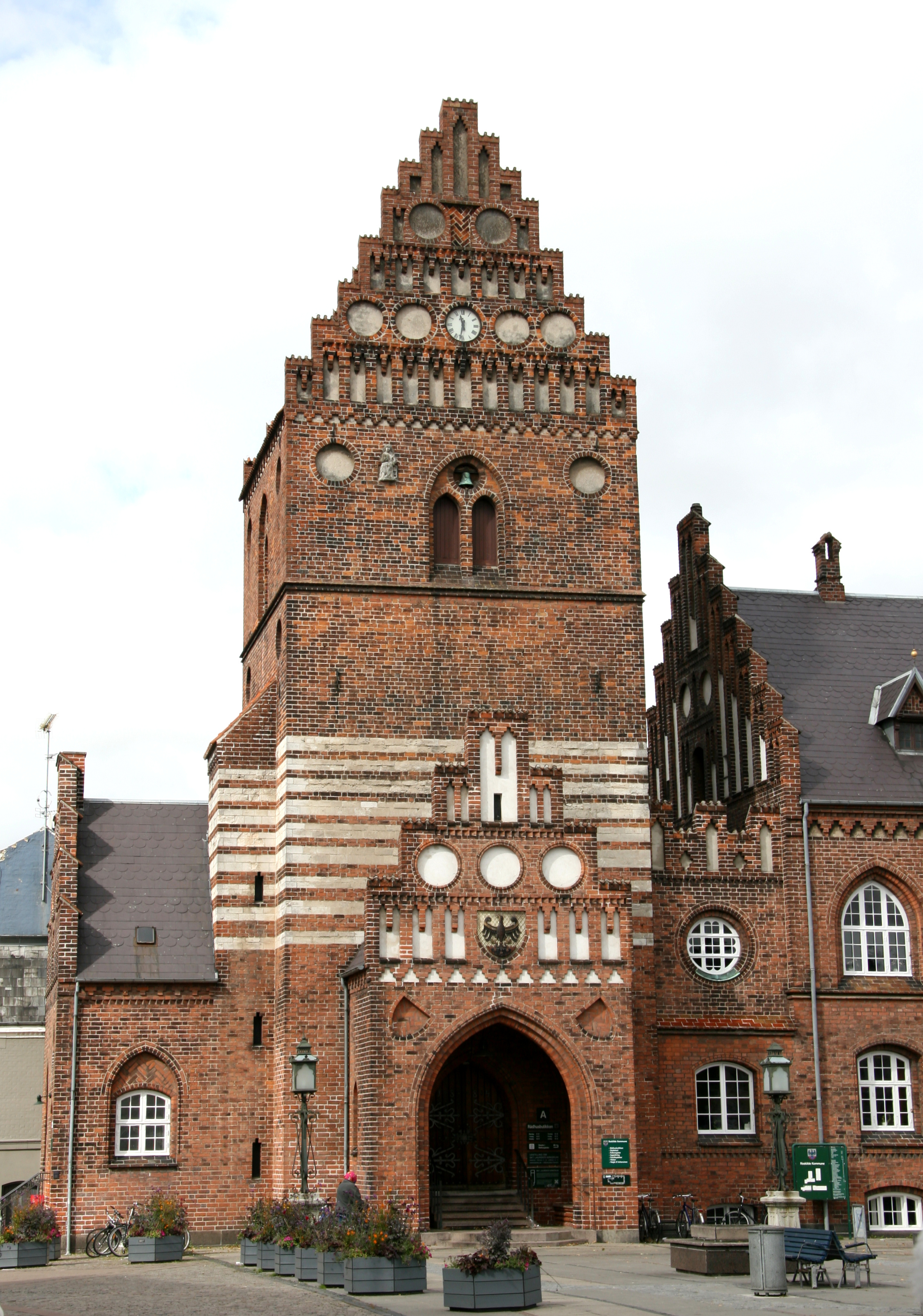
Sankt Laurentii Mama Tower

The Sankt Laurentii Church Mama Tower is all that remains of Sankt Laurentii Church in Roskilde on the Danish island of Zealand. The church itself was built of travertine in the Romanesque style in the 13th century but was torn down after the Reformation leaving only the tower from the beginning of the 16th century. The tower now forms part of the former town hall. It contains a museum where archaeological finds from 1998 can be seen.

== See also ==
- Listed buildings in Roskilde Municipality
- List of churches in Roskilde Municipality
