= List of churches in Roskilde Municipality =

1: Jyllinge 2: Gundsømagle 3: Kirkerup 4: Hvedstrup 5: Ågerup 6: Himmelev 7: Sankt Jørgensbjerg 8: Roskilde Domsogn 9: Svogerslev 10: Roskilde Søndre 11: Vindinge 12: Vor Frue 13: Dåstrup 14: Syv 15: Gadstrup 16: Snoldelev 17: Ørsted

This list of churches in Roskilde Municipality lists Church buildings in Roskilde Municipality, Denmark.

== Church of Denmark ==
Name	Location	Year	Coordinates	Image	Refs
Ågerup Church	Ågerup				
Dåstrup Church	Dåstrup	c. 1300	55°7′37.2″N 11°57′13.67″E		
Gadstrup Church	Gadstrup				
Gundsømagle of Our Lady	Gundsømagle	c. 1080	55°38′18.6″N 12°04′56.31″E		
Himmelev Church	Himmelev		55°38′18.6″N 12°08′39.11″E		
Hvedstrup Church	Hvedstrup				
St Ib's Church	Roskilde				
Jacob's Church	Roskilde	1974	55°37′46.5″N 12°05′52.9″E		
Jyllinge Church	Jyllinge	12th century	55°45′6.55″N 12°06′17.4″E		
Kirkerup Church	Kirkerup				
New Church of Our Lady	Roskilde	1907	55°36′33.4″N 12°05′53.4″E		
Old Church of Our Lady	Roskilde	c. 1080	55°38′18.6″N 12°04′56.3″E		
Ørsted Church	Ørsted	c. 1189			
Roskilde Cathedral	Roskilde	1175	55°38′32″N 12°04′47″E		
St Jørgensbjerg Church	Sankt Jørgensbjerg	1080	55°38′57.5″N 12°04′32.5″E		
Snoldelev Church	Snoldelev	c. 1100	55°34′16.1″N 12°07′54.4″E		
Svogerslev Church	Svogerslev				
Syv Church	Syv				
Vindinge Church	Vindinge	1875	55°37′31.6″N 12°08′15.2″E		

== Roman–Catholic ==
Name	Location	Year	Coordinates	Image	Refs
St. Lawrence's Church	Roskilde	1914			Ref
