= Roskilde Vikings Rugby Klub =

Danish rugby club

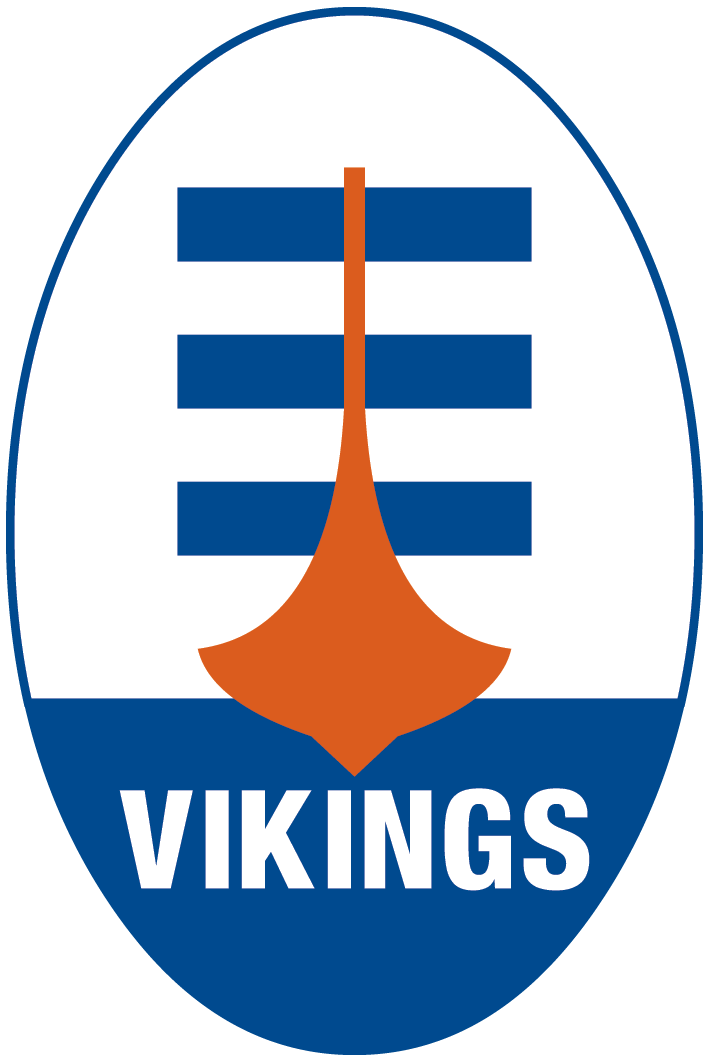
- Full name: Roskilde Vikings Rugby Klub
- Nickname: Vikings
- Founded: 2010
- Location: Roskilde, Denmark
- Ground(s): Vor Frue, Roskilde

Official website
- www.roskilderugby.dk

Roskilde Vikings Rugby Klub began on 22 August 2010 when around 15 players attended the first ever training session. There had apparently also been an earlier attempt to start a rugby club in Roskilde, but little is known about this.

The club was established under the auspices of Vor Frue Idræts Forening after committee member Kenneth Nielsen noticed that the club's facilities were under-utilised. He had first encountered rugby as an exchange student in Perth, Australia in 1995 and thought it might bring it much-needed new membership.

The board of Vor Frue IF agreed and invested in the necessary equipment to get things started and continues to oversee the sporting activities while the rugby club focuses on promoting the game of rugby and raising funds.

Since 2010, the membership has grown steadily, with a youth section added in 2016 and a women's team in 2019. rugby club in Roskilde. The club forms part of the Vor Frue Idrætsforening (Sports Club). The club's senior men's team currently plays in the DRU (Dansk Rugby Union) Division Two East.

== Honours ==
Men:

Scandinavian 7s Bowl, winners, 2016

Youth teams:

Fritz Feyerherm Tournament, Berlin, Under-14 winners 2018 (combined team with Dragør Rugby Klub)

Fritz Feyerherm Tournament, Berlin, Under-12 runners-up 2018 (combined team with Dragør Rugby Klub)

Danish National Championship, Under-14 bronze medal winners 2019 (combined team with Dragør Rugby Klub)
