= DLF (seed company) =

Danish seed company

DLF Seeds
- Company type: Private limited company
- Industry: Seed business
- Founded: 1988 (DLF AmbA founded in 1906)
- Headquarters: Ny Østergade 9, Roskilde. Denmark, Roskilde, Denmark
- Number of locations: The Netherlands, United Kingdom, Ireland, France, Sweden, Germany, Poland, Czech Republic, Italy, Turkey, Russia, China, Canada, USA, Uruguay, Argentina, Brazil, Paraguay, South Africa, Australia and New Zealand
- Area served: 100 Countries
- Key people: Søren Halbye (CEO); Christian Høegh-Andersen (Chairman)
- Revenue: DKK 7,437m (2019/20)
- Number of employees: 1,983 (2019/20)
- Website: www.dlf.com

DLF Seeds A/S (formerly DLF-TRIFOLIUM A/S) is a global seed company dealing in forage, amenity seeds, sugar, beet seed, ware potatoes, and other crops. The company's headquarters is located in Roskilde, Denmark. DLF is the global market leader and provides grass and clover seeds to over 100 countries. DLF operates within four different business areas. DLF is the market leader in forage and turf seed with an estimated share of approximately 50% in Europe and 30% on a global scale. DLF provides grass seeds for major sporting events worldwide, including the UEFA Champions League, UEFA Europa League, the FIFA Football World Cup for both men and women, The Olympic Games, The Premier League and the list goes on.

== Business areas ==
These four business areas, each of which have independent and different business dynamics, are run individually as their product portfolios, customer segments and supply chains all have individual characteristics.

- Forage and turf seeds including forage & turf grasses, forage brassicas, clovers and alfalfa, herbs and cover crops.
- Sugar and fodder beet seeds – organized in MariboHilleshög.
- Vegetable seeds, propagation and seed processing organized in Jensen Seeds.
- Potatoes – organized in Danespo.

The company produces approximately 300 different varieties that are components in several grass seed mixtures and brands.

Its corporate brands are ForageMax, Masterline, Turfline, Johnsons Lawn Seed and Johnsons Sports Seed.

== Ownership ==
The company is owned by 2,800 Danish grass seed growers through DLF AmbA, and employs more than 2000 people in over 20 countries. DLF supplies clover and grass seeds for more than 100 countries for purposes ranging from forage grasses for agriculture to turf grasses for both the professional and private markets.

== Companies ==
The company is vertically integrated in research, production, and sales. DLF's headquarters is in Roskilde, Denmark and is also present in The Netherlands, United Kingdom, Ireland, France, Sweden, Germany, Poland, Czech Republic, Italy, Turkey, Russia, China, Canada, USA, Uruguay, Argentina, Brazil, Paraguay, South Africa, Australia, and New Zealand.

== See also ==
- Company History
