= Hyrdehøj =

District in Zealand, Denmark

Coordinates: 55°37′54″N 12°3′36″E

Hyrdehøj is a district in the southwest of Roskilde on the Danish island of Zealand. It was established in 2002 and has since been gradually expanded. The name comes from the nearby Hyrdehøj Forest, as well as the burial mound of Hyrdehøj.
