= Danish Meat Trade College =

Coordinates: 55°37′41″N 12°04′40″E

The Danish Meat Trade College (Danish: Slagteriskolen) founded in 1964 is a non-profit educational institution in Roskilde, Denmark. It offers vocational training courses in industrial slaughter, retail butchering, sausage making, nutrition and the meat service sector. Training is also offered to kitchen staff, waiters, cooks and bakers.

The school employs about 150 teachers and supporting staff. Courses are also available for international students. The school has a hostel with accommodation for some 200 students. The school was expanded with a 3,000 square metres in 2011. A glass corridor connects the new and old building.
