= Roskilde Roklub =

Danish rowing club

- Location: Roskilde, Denmark
- Founded: 1890
- Membership: Roskilde Fjord
- Affiliations: Danish National Rowing Center
- Website: roskilderoklub.dk

Roskilde Roklub (English: Roskilde Rowing Club) is a rowing club based in Roskilde, Denmark. Its home water is Roskilde Fjord.

== History ==
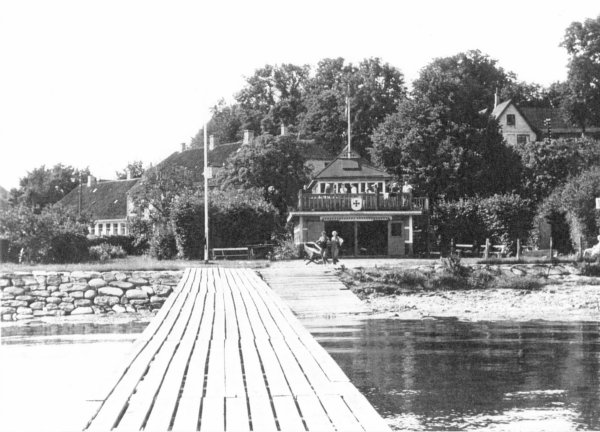
The corner of Grønningen and Esplanaden viewed from Kastellet

The club was founded in 1890.

== International performances ==
Carl-Ebbe Andersen, Tage Henriksen, and Finn Pedersen won gold in Rowing, Men's Coxed Pairs at the 1948 Summer Olympics.

Thomas Ebert won a bronze medal in Men's lightweight coxless four at the 2000 Summer Olympics in Sydney and gold at the 2004 Summer Olympics in Athens and 2008 Summer Olympics.

Kasper Winther Jørgensen and Jacob Barsøe participated at the 2012 Summer Olympics Men's lightweight coxless four and won gold in at the 2013 World Rowing Championships and again at the 2014 World Rowing Championships in Amsterdam.

== See also ==
- Københavns Roklub
