= Folkeparken, Roskilde =

Public park in Denmark

Coordinates: 55°38′43″N 12°05′16″E

Folkeparken (English: People's Park) is the largest public park in central Roskilde, Denmark. The park adjoins two other parks, Berte Margrethe Anlægget and Klostermarken.

== History ==
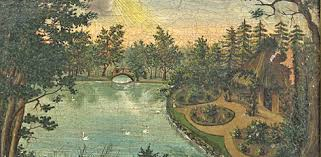
Møstingholm in c, 1850

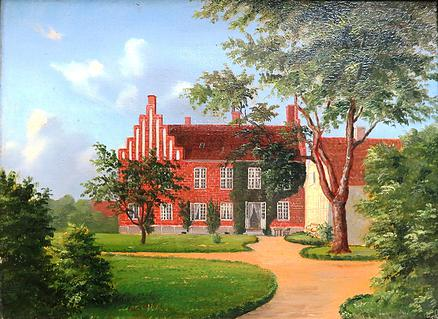
The park in 1890

The area was originally used for grazing by Roskilde Convent. With holdings of almost 1,000 hectares of land, the convent was one of the largest land owners in Roskilde. The convent's farm, Ladegården, was located to the rear of the convent, where Roskilde Library stands today.

In 1819, the Convent established a three hectares park on part of their land. The park contained a number of artificial lakes which had been created as fishing ponds since the 18th century. It was created for the nuns but was also open to other citizens. It was the largest park with public access in Roskilde at the time. The only exception was Møstingholm, a small peninsula on one of the lakes, which featured a pavilion where the residents of the convent often had their afternoon tea. Møstingsholm was named after Christiane Møsting, the prioress of the convent from 1797 until 1820.

In 1904, Roskilde Convent decided to almost double the size of their park. Completed in 1906, the new section was designed by E. Galschiøtt and restored several of the old fishing ponds which had dried out over the years. It was named Berte-Margrethe Anlægget ("The Berthe-Margrethe Complex") in memory of Berthe Skeel and Margrethe Ulfeld, the two founders of the convent.

Between 1908 and 1923, the city purchased approximately 50 ha of land from the convent with the intention of selling it off in lots for redevelopment with private houses. In 1934, the city council decided to establish Folkeparken on part of the land. The new park was designed by the landscape architect Carl Theodor Sørensen. In 1950, Roskilde Municipality purchased Klostermarken and Berte Margrete Anlægget from the convent.

== Amphitheatre ==
Folkeparken contains an amphitheatre which is used for concerts and theatrical productions in the summer time. On Thursdays in the summer time, the city arranges entertainment for children.

== Artworks ==
In front of the entrance to Klosterengen stands the Frog Fountain. It was created by a local artist, Karl Glenn.

Artworks in Folkeparken include the sculpture group The Seven Days of the Week. It was created by Morten Nielsen and is a gift from Nordea.

== See also ==
- Byparken, Roskilde
