= Byparken, Roskilde =

Public park in central Roskilde, Denmark

Coordinates: 55.646°N 12.080°E

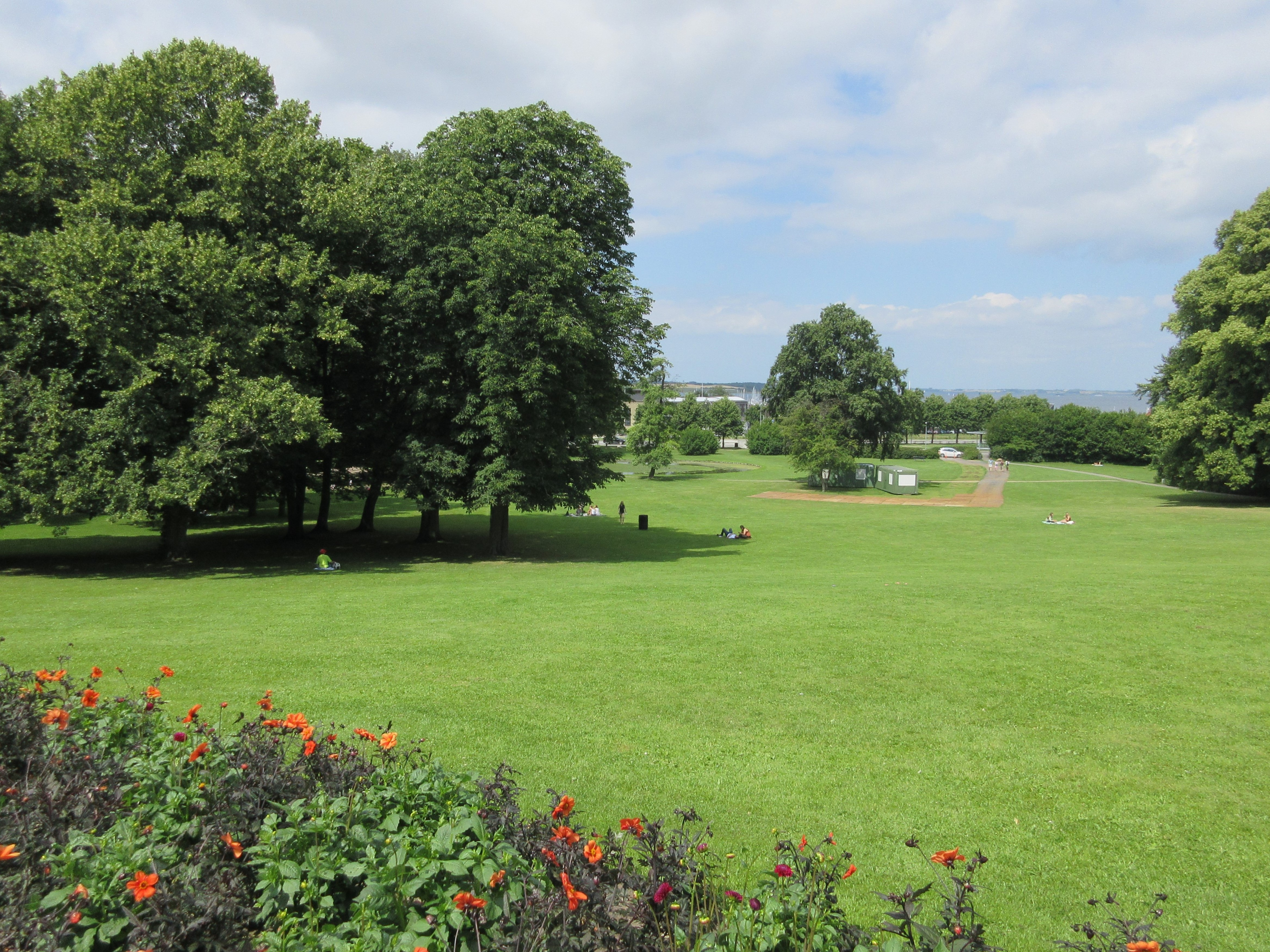
Byparken

Byparken is a public park in central Roskilde, Denmark. It was founded in 1915 and was partly financed through a donation of the textile manufacturer O. H. Schmeltz. The park adjoins Provstevænget, a small protected field next to Roskilde Cathedral. Together, the two areas form a large green space between the cathedral and Roskilde Fjord.

== History ==
In the Middle Ages, Provstevænget was the site of St John's Church (Danish: Sankt Hans' Kirke) and the surrounding neighbourhood, which formed St John Parish, one of medieval Roskilde's 13 parishes, was home to many of the canons associated with the cathedral. In 1443, Roskilde Cathedral was hit by fire and it soon spread to the areas to the north and west of the building. The area where Provstevænget is today was never rebuilt. With the Reformation, Roskilde lost much of its income and the city experienced a long period of recession. For several hundred years, Provstevænget belonged to the Provost's House (Danish_ Provstegården) and was grazed by cattle.

In 1898, Roskilde inherited a large sum of money from the textile manufacturer Otto Henrich Schmeltz. Some of the money were reserved for the establishment of a park ""not used for any kind of sports". In 1915, the city used some of the money for the acquisition of a piece of land on the north side of Provstevænget. The area had until then been farmland. The new park was designed by the landscape architect Aage Hansen.

== Today ==
A thatched house, Piper's House, is located inside the park. It is now used as a restaurant. The hill next to the building is often used for open-air concerts, for instance on every Tuesday in July.
