= Himmelev =

Area of Roskilde, Denmark

Coordinates: 55°39′32.5″N 12°6′25.9″E

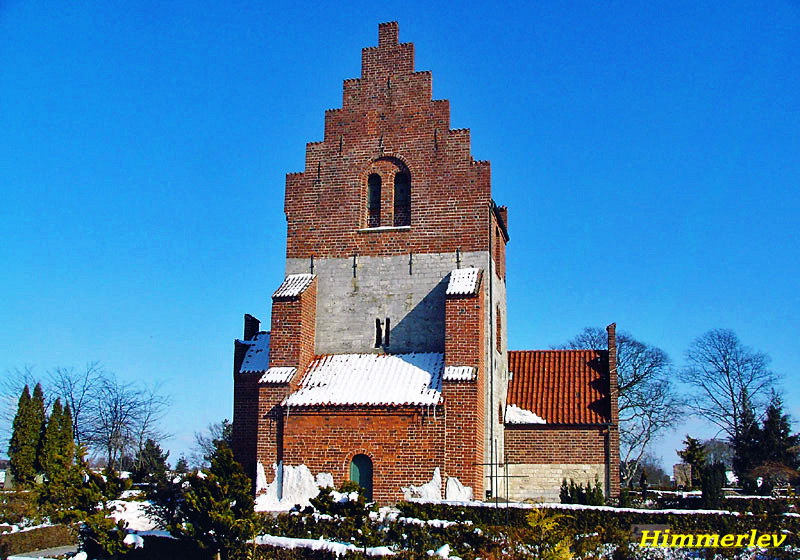
Himmelev Church

Himmelev is a largely residential area in the municipality of Roskilde in Denmark and is contiguous with Roskilde. The population in the parish is around 14,000 (2022). It is on the eastern shore of the southernmost part of Roskilde Fjord. It contains primarily subdivisions with single family homes, but one of the three high schools in Roskilde, Himmelev Gymnasium, is also located the town. The Norwegian owned liver paté factory Stryhn's is located in the northwestern part of Himmelev, close to Roskilde Fjord. Veddelev lies slightly to the northwest on a peninsula extending into Roskilde fjord, leaving a narrow waterway of one kilometer extending to the southeast into a rectangular shaped area of the fjord of around 8 sq mi, which contains Roskilde harbor to the south. Further north lies Risø on another peninsula in the fjord.

== History ==
Himmelev and Veddelev are named for two major land owners from the 7th century, Hemi og Withi (Hemeløw: Hemi's inherited lot and Witheløff, With's inherited lot). Himmelev was located in Sømme Herred and emerged as a parish some time during the 12th century. The residents were mainly farmers. The parish belonged to Roskilde Abbey. In 1731, the members of the parish obtained the right to elect their own priest. The first school opened in 1741 and was expanded in 1914. In 1906, Himmelev had a population of 600. Roskilde Folk High School opened in Himmelev in 1907. The land was redeveloped with single family detached homes in the 1960s and 1970s.

== Landmarks ==
Himmelev Church dates from the 12th century. It consists of a Romanesque nave with a Late Gothic extension to the east, a Late Romanesque tower and a porch. The vaulted ceiling dates from the 14th century.

The old school from 1909 is located immediately to the west of the wall that surrounds the cemetery. The building was designed by H. C. Mayling. It was decommissioned as a school in 1980 and has now been converted into apartments. Himmelev Gymnasium was founded in 1978. In 1980, it moved from its original home on Allehelgensgade to its current premises on Herregårdsvej. Next to the school is a sports centre with six soccer pitches and indoor facilities for eight badminton courts and a court for handball, five-a-side football and other sports. Himmelevgård has been an equestrian centre since 1964.

The 150 room Comwell Roskilde conference hotel is also located in Himmerlev, overlooking Roskilde Fjord. Industry includes the corporate headquarters and a factory for Stryhns meat paste.

== Surroundings ==
In 2003, it was decided to establish a new, 300 ha (740 acres) state forest north of Roskilde, partly to protect ground water resources. In 2010 the first 141 ha of Himmerlev Forest had been planted by the Danish Nature Agency in collaboration with Københavns Energi (now HOFOR) and Roskilde Municipality. They had planted a total of 220,000 plants and established 9.3 km (5.8 mi) of walking trails and 5.2 km (3.2 mi) of riding trails.

== Notable people ==
- Frederik Schmidt - parish priest from 1820 to 1840
- Kim Milton - Soccer Referee
- Simon Juul - Comedian
- Mads Hvilsom - Footballer
