= Jacob Kornerup =

Danish archeologist and painter

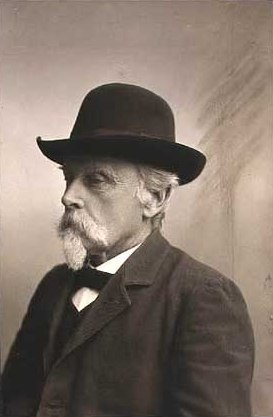
Jacob Kornerup c. 1900

Jacob Kornerup (19 November 1825 – 9 March 1913) was a Danish archeologist and painter who is remembered above all for discovering and restoring medieval frescos in Danish churches.

== Biography ==
Born into a well-to-do Roskilde family, he matriculated from high school in Roskilde before attending the Royal Danish Academy of Fine Arts from 1847 to 1853, winning the Grand Silver Medal. He first painted portraits and landscapes but soon concentrated on architectural painting, influenced by study tours to Gotland (1981) with Johan Daniel Herholdt and to Germany, Dalmatia and Italy (1854–55) with Ferdinand Meldahl. Painting was not however enough to satisfy him. As a child, he had shown interest in his home town, Roskilde. His acquaintance with the archeologist Jens Jacob Asmussen Worsaae encouraged him to become involved in the restoration of historical buildings in collaboration with the National Museum, leading to hundreds of drawings and watercolors which are now in the museum's archives. His drawings of Jellinghøjene (the burial mounds of Jelling) which he drew while working with Worsaae and Christian Herbst can be seen in his Kongehøiene i Jellinge (1875).

== Church frescos and historical monuments ==
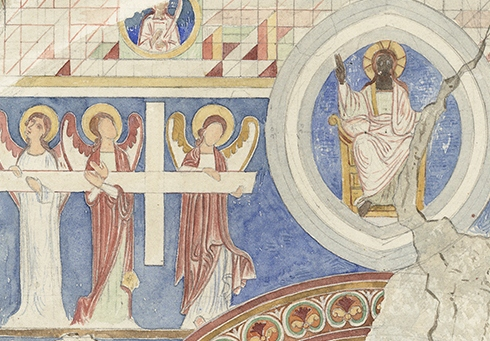
Kornerup's watercolor of frescos in St Ibs Church, Roskilde (1900)

One of his foremost interests was in the preservation of Denmark's medieval church frescos in which he pioneered restoration work from 1862 to 1904, becoming one of the Denmark's central figures in the field. He uncovered murals in 80 churches across the land that had been whitewashed over after the Reformation. While his restoration work did not meet today's exacting standards, it nonetheless benefitted from his artistic background and his growing knowledge of archeology. He also became an adviser in connection with the restoration of Roskilde Cathedral when work started in the 1850s. Settling in Roskilde in 1855, he also took an active interest in the preservation of the city's other historic monuments.

== Published works ==
In addition to contributions to periodicals and other works, Kornerup published the following:

- Kongehøjene i Jellinge (1875)
- Roskilde Domkirke (1877, in Danske Mindesmærker)
- Roskilde i gamle Dage (1892)
- Skildringer fra Spanien (1863)
- Roskilde Minder (1907)

== Exhibitions ==
In 2013, to commemorate the 100th anniversary of his death, Roskilde Museum presented an exhibition of Kornerup's art work.
