= Roskilde =

- Town
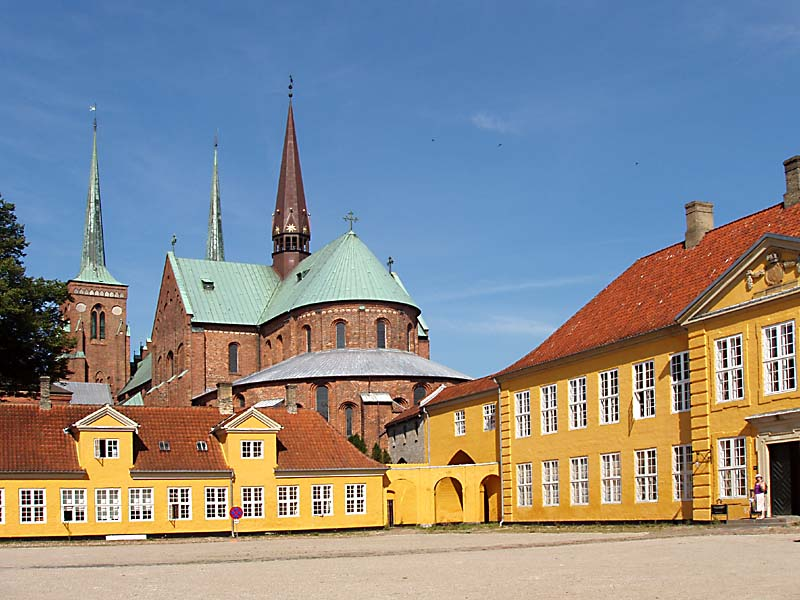
- Roskilde Cathedral

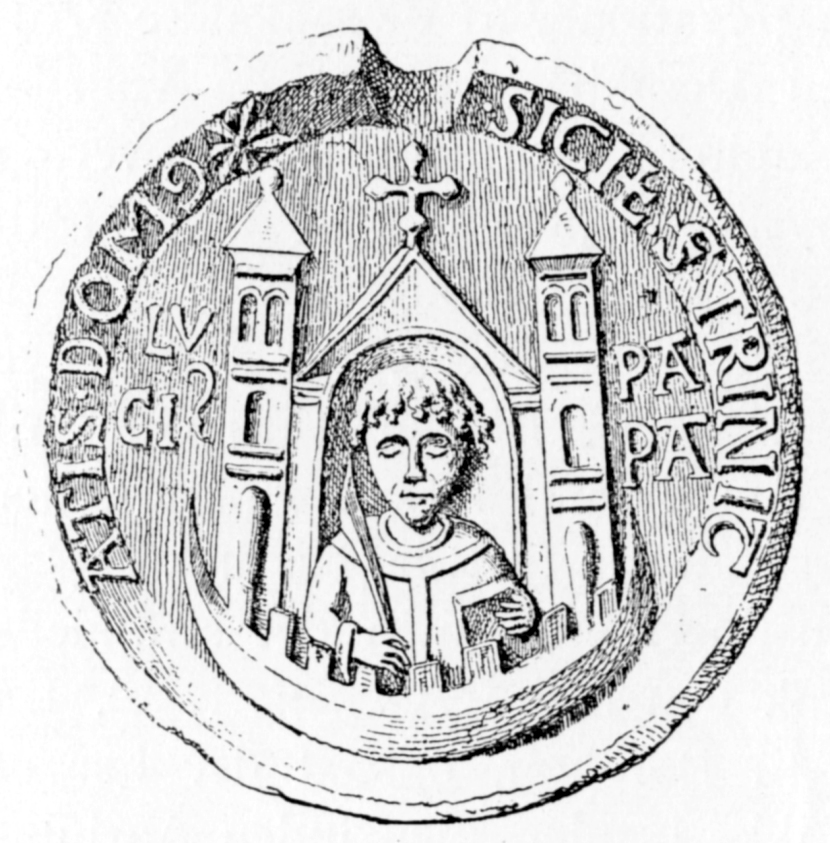
- Seal Coat of arms

- Location in Denmark Roskilde (Denmark Region Zealand)
- Coordinates: 55°39′N 12°05′E
- Country: Denmark
- Region: Zealand (Sjælland)
- Municipality: Roskilde
- Established: 980s

Government
  - Mayor: Thomas Bredam (S)

Area
  - Urban: 21.3 km^{2} (8.2 sq mi)

Population (1 January 2026)
  - Urban: 53,897
  - Urban density: 2,530/km^{2} (6,550/sq mi)
  - Metro: 93,162
  - Gender: 25,980 males and 27,917 females
- Demonym: Roskildenser
- Time zone: UTC+1 (CET)
  - Summer (DST): UTC+2 (CEST)
- Postal code: DK-4000 Roskilde
- Website: roskilde.dk

Roskilde (/ˈrɒskɪlə/ ROSK-il-ə, Danish: [ˈʁʌskilə]) is a city 30 km (19 mi) west of Copenhagen on the Danish island of Zealand. With a population of 53,897 (as of 1 January 2026), the city is a business and educational centre for the region and the 10th largest city in Denmark. It is governed by the administrative council of Roskilde Municipality.

Roskilde has a long history, dating from the pre-Christian Viking Age. Its UNESCO-listed Gothic cathedral, now housing 39 tombs of the Danish monarchs, was completed in 1275, becoming a focus of religious influence until the Reformation. With the development of the rail network in the 19th century, Roskilde became an important hub for traffic with Copenhagen, and by the end of the century, there were tobacco factories, iron foundries and machine shops. Among the largest private sector employers today are the IT firm BEC (Bankernes EDB Central) and seed company DLF. The Risø research facility is also becoming a major employer, extending interest in sustainable energy to the clean technology sphere. The local university, founded in 1972, the historic Cathedral School, and the Danish Meat Trade College, established in 1964, are educational institutions of note. Roskilde has a large local hospital which has been expanded and modernized since it was opened in 1855. It is now increasingly active in the research sphere. The Sankt Hans psychiatric hospital serves the Capital Region with specialized facilities for forensic psychiatry.

The cathedral and the Viking Ship Museum, which contains the well-preserved remains of five 11th-century ships, attract more than 100,000 visitors annually. In addition to its internationally recognized tourist attractions and its annual rock festival, Roskilde is popular with shoppers thanks to its two centrally located pedestrian streets complete with restaurants, cafés, and a variety of shops. The city is home to the FC Roskilde football club which play in the Danish 1st Division, the Roskilde Vikings RK rugby club, and the rowing club, Roskilde Roklub. In the 1970s, the city benefited from the opening of the university and from the completion of the Holbæk Motorway connecting it to Copenhagen. Roskilde has the oldest operational railway station in Denmark, with connections across Zealand as well as with Falster, Lolland, and Jutland. The local airport opened in 1973, mainly serving light aircraft for business use and flight instruction.

Among the city's notable citizens are Absalon, the bishop who founded Copenhagen in the 12th century, L. A. Ring, the symbolist painter who gained fame in the 1880s, the writer Lise Nørgaard who wrote the popular Danish TV series Matador in 1978 and the rower Thomas Ebert who became an Olympic gold medallist in 2004.

== History ==
Roskilde, which developed as the hub of the Viking land and sea trade routes over a thousand years ago, is one of Denmark's oldest cities. From the 11th century until 1443, it was the capital of Denmark. By the Middle Ages, with the support of kings and bishops, it had become one of the most important centres in Scandinavia. Saxo Grammaticus and other early sources associate the name Roskilde (meaning 'Ro's spring') with the legendary King Roar who possibly lived there in the 6th century.

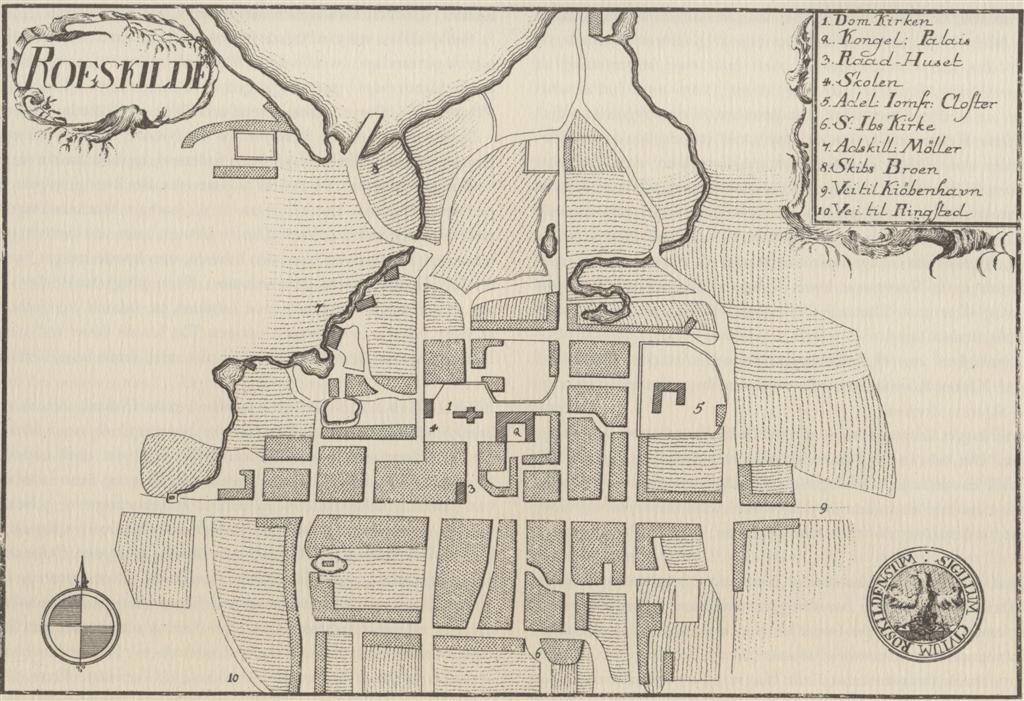
Old map of Roskilde

According to Adam of Bremen and Saxo Grammaticus, Roskilde was founded in the 980s by Harald Bluetooth. On high ground above the harbour, he built a wooden church consecrated to the Holy Trinity as well as a royal residence nearby. Although no traces of these buildings have been discovered, in 1997 archaeologists found the remains of Viking ships in the Isefjord, the oldest of which is dated to 1030. At the time, there were also two churches in the area: St Jørgensbjerg, an early stone church, and a wooden church discovered under today's St Ib's Church.

In 1020, King Cnut elevated Roskilde to a bishopric, giving it high national status. Absalon, the Danish bishop, had a brick church built on the site of Harald's church in 1170. Today's cathedral was completed in 1275 after five of Absalon's successors had contributed to its construction. As a result of Absalon's influence, many other churches were built in the vicinity, making Roskilde the most important town in Zealand. Coins were minted there from the 11th to the 14th century. In 1150, Sweyn Grathe built a moat around the city. In 1135 the town was destroyed by the Pomeranian duke Ratibor I. In 1151/2, a religious confraternity was founded for the defence of the town against Wendish pirates. Under the command of Wetheman, it also took part in the Wendish Crusade. The Roskilde bishops owned large areas of land in the region including, from 1186, Havn on the Øresund which later became Copenhagen. By the time of the Danish Reformation in 1536, there were 12 churches and five monasteries in the city.

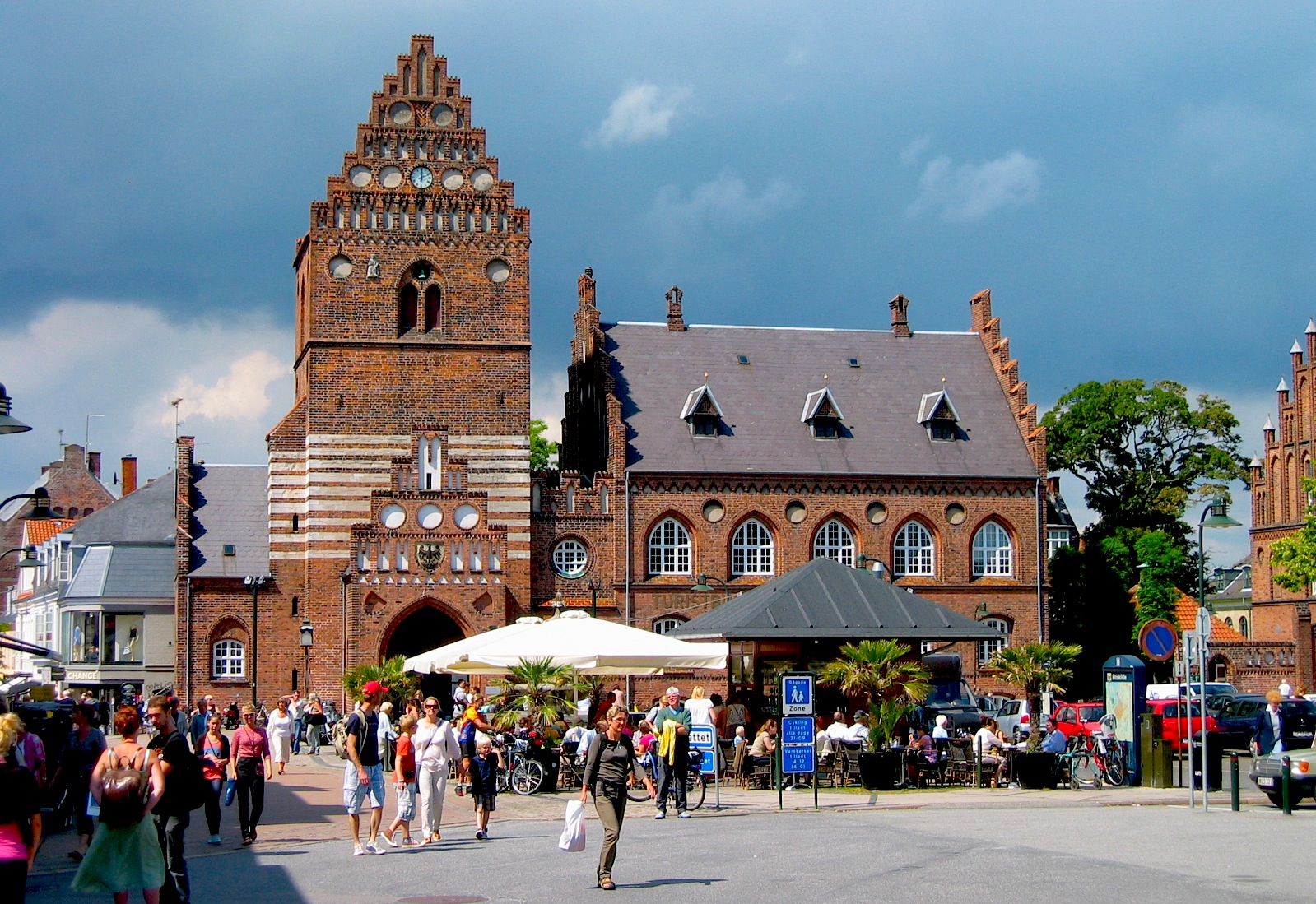
The former city hall of Roskilde, completed in 1884

It is unclear when Roskilde became a market town but it was certainly enjoying trading privileges under King Eric II who reigned from 1134 to 1137. These privileges were firmly established when the Roskilde City Council granted market town status to other towns on Zealand on 15 June 1268. By that time, it was probably the largest and most important town in Denmark. In 1370, the city owned 2,600 farms throughout Zealand.

The Reformation brought Roskilde's development to an abrupt stop. While the cathedral continued to be the preferred location for the entombment of the Danish monarchs, most of the other religious institutions disappeared. For the next three centuries, the city suffered a series of disasters including the effects of the Dano-Swedish War which terminated with the Treaty of Roskilde in 1658, the plague in 1710 and 1711, and a series of fires in 1730. Conditions improved in 1835 when the city became the Assembly of the Estates of the Realm (Rådgivende Stænderforsamling) and in 1847 with the railway connecting Copenhagen and Roskilde.

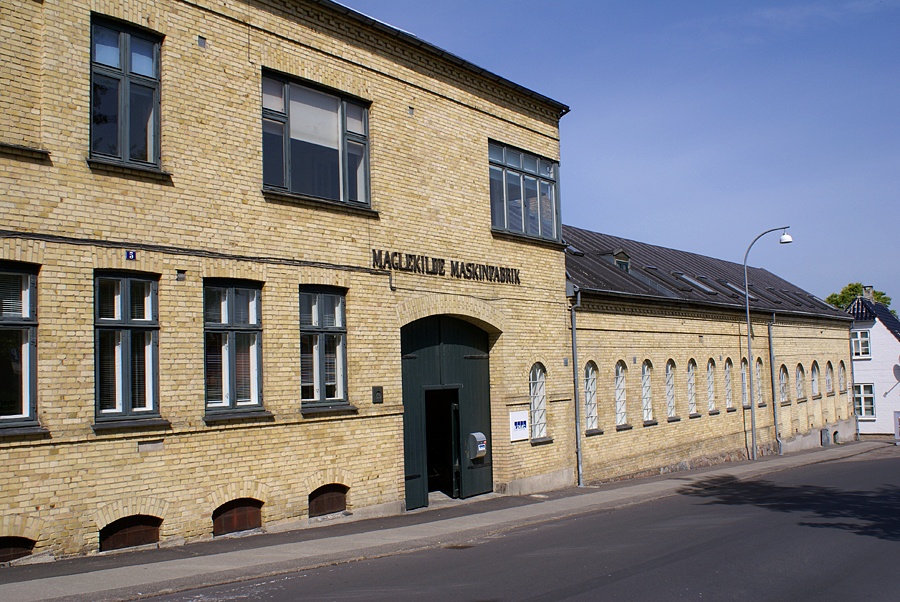
Maglekilde Machine Factory (completed 1865)

With the development of the rail network, Roskilde became an important hub for traffic with Copenhagen. In the 1870s and 1880s, the harbour was extended attracting industrial firms to the area. By the end of the century, there were tobacco factories, iron foundries and machine shops. At the beginning of the 20th century, Roskilde first prospered as a satellite community for Copenhagen but then, as ships increased in size, suffered from the fact that the harbour was too small and Roskilde Fjord too shallow for navigation. Industries began to move out of the harbour area but were still the largest source of employment, thanks in part to the spirits factory (De Danske Spritfabrikker) and the slaughterhouse (Roskilde Andelssvineslagteri).

In the 1970s, the city benefited from the Holbæk Motorway which linked it to Copenhagen and the establishment of Roskilde University in 1972. Since the 1980s, the service sector has prospered, replacing manufacturing industry as the major employer (65% by 2002). With the increase in population, several new districts have grown up, including Himmelev and Kongebakken. Some of the surrounding villages such as Svogerslev, Vor Frue, Vindinge and Veddelev have developed as satellite communities.

== Geography ==
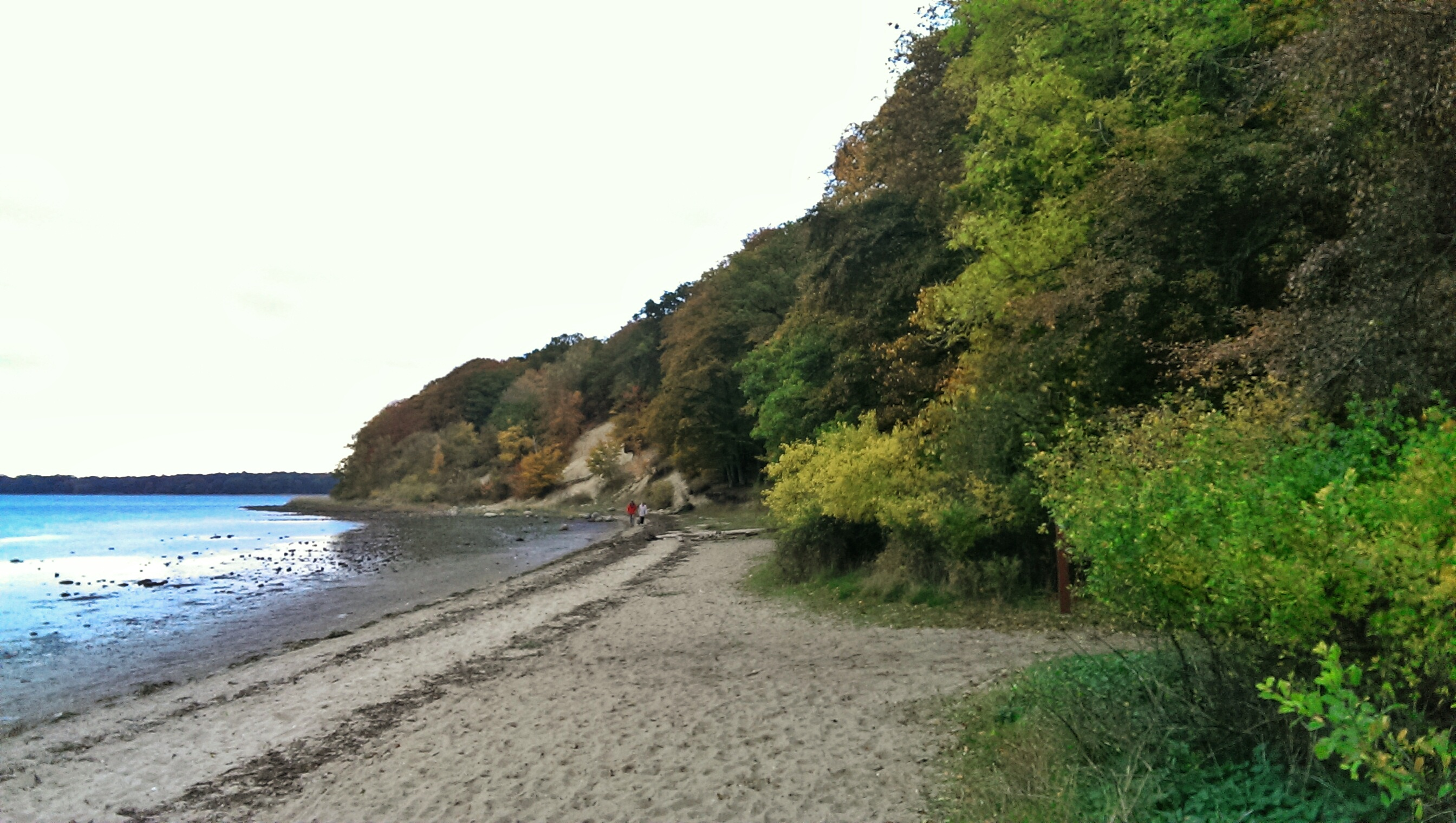
Boserup Skov

Roskilde is located in north-central Zealand at the south end of Roskilde Fjord which is itself the south branch of the Isefjord. By road, it is 35.6 kilometres (22.1 mi) west of downtown Copenhagen, 25.8 km (16.0 mi) northwest of Køge and 39.8 kilometres (24.7 mi) northeast of Ringsted. The city centre around the cathedral, 1,300 m (4,300 ft) south of the fjord, is about 40 m (130 ft) above sea level. On the slope down to the harbour, there are a number of springs, the most powerful of which is Maglekilde. The historic centre of the town covers the area around the main streets Skomagergade and Algade including the squares of Stændertorvet and Hestetorvet. Two parks, Byparken and Folkeparken which run down towards the fjord, are immediately north of the old town.

Neighbourhoods in the vicinity include Himmelev, Hyrdehøj, Musicon, Sankt Jørgensbjerg and Trekroner. Boserup Skov, a wood next to Roskidle Fjord 3 km (2 mi) northwest of the city centre, consists mainly of beech trees. In spring, its hilly slopes are covered with wild flowers, including white, blue and yellow anemones. Chaffinches, nightingales and other songbirds can be heard in the early summer. Also of note is the recently planted wooded area of Hyrdehøj Skov, to the south of the stadium and just north of Route 23 in the southern outskirts of Roskilde.

== Climate ==
Climate data for Roskilde (Roskilde Airport) (1991–2020 normals, extremes 1974–1997)
Month	Jan	Feb	Mar	Apr	May	Jun	Jul	Aug	Sep	Oct	Nov	Dec	Year
Record high °C (°F)	10.5 (50.9)	14.5 (58.1)	18.6 (65.5)	27.0 (80.6)	31.0 (87.8)	31.0 (87.8)	33.1 (91.6)	33.2 (91.8)	27.2 (81.0)	22.3 (72.1)	14.0 (57.2)	12.7 (54.9)	33.2 (91.8)
Mean daily maximum °C (°F)	3.1 (37.6)	3.3 (37.9)	6.3 (43.3)	11.4 (52.5)	15.8 (60.4)	19.1 (66.4)	21.6 (70.9)	21.3 (70.3)	17.3 (63.1)	12.1 (53.8)	7.3 (45.1)	4.3 (39.7)	11.9 (53.4)
Daily mean °C (°F)	0.8 (33.4)	1.0 (33.8)	3.0 (37.4)	7.2 (45.0)	11.2 (52.2)	14.5 (58.1)	17.0 (62.6)	16.9 (62.4)	13.4 (56.1)	9.0 (48.2)	5.0 (41.0)	2.1 (35.8)	8.4 (47.2)
Mean daily minimum °C (°F)	−1.5 (29.3)	−1.4 (29.5)	−0.3 (31.5)	3.1 (37.6)	6.6 (43.9)	10.0 (50.0)	12.3 (54.1)	12.4 (54.3)	9.6 (49.3)	6.0 (42.8)	2.7 (36.9)	−0.1 (31.8)	5.0 (40.9)
Record low °C (°F)	−21.3 (−6.3)	−20.0 (−4.0)	−20.4 (−4.7)	−7.7 (18.1)	−3.0 (26.6)	0.5 (32.9)	4.0 (39.2)	3.9 (39.0)	−2.0 (28.4)	−6.2 (20.8)	−14.0 (6.8)	−21.0 (−5.8)	−21.3 (−6.3)
Average precipitation mm (inches)	45 (1.8)	28 (1.1)	36 (1.4)	36 (1.4)	41 (1.6)	51 (2.0)	65 (2.6)	63 (2.5)	57 (2.2)	52 (2.0)	57 (2.2)	53 (2.1)	584 (22.9)
Average snowy days	5.5	4.0	3.6	1.3	0.1	0	0	0	0	0.1	1.7	4.7	21
Average relative humidity (%)	87	85	83	74	69	71	70	72	78	81	85	87	79
Source 1: Danish Meteorological Institute (precipitation, humidity and snow 1961–1990)
Source 2: IEM (humidity 1992–2020)

== Demographics and administration ==
Roskilde Municipality (Q42026)
Country of birth	Population
Denmark	81,520
Turkey	1,581
Ukraine	857
Syria	687
Afghanistan	598
Iraq	526
Poland	523
Iran	356
(Lebanon) Libanon	353
Germany	344
India	292
China	291

As early as 1070, Adam von Bremen referred to Roskilde as "Zealand's largest town". At the time of the Reformation in 1536, it had some 6,000 inhabitants but as a result of war, fire and disease, by 1753 its population had dropped to only 1,550. By the 1860s, it had grown to around 5,000 and by the 1900s to some 9,000. Thereafter it increased appreciably until 1970 when there were almost 45,000 inhabitants. The population dipped slightly to 40,000 in the 1980s, but thanks to improved connections with Copenhagen and the establishment of the university, it grew steadily to reach 47,117 by 2014 making Roskilde Denmark's tenth largest city.

In Roskilde Municipality as of 1 October 2014, 76,545 residents had Danish background, 6,287 were immigrants and 2,006 were second or third generation descendants of immigrants. The most common countries of birth of foreign-born residents of Roskilde Municipality are Turkey, Iraq, Poland and Afghanistan.

Roskilde is governed by the administrative council of Roskilde Municipality. Following the local elections of November 2013, Joy Mogensen (born 1980), a Social Democrat, was reappointed mayor (first elected mayor in 2011), gaining three additional seats on the council. The council now consists of 13 seats for the Social Democrats, one for the Social Liberal Party, one for the Conservative People's Party, one for the Socialist People's Party, three for the People's Party, nine for the Left Liberal Party and three for the Red–Green Alliance.

== Economy ==
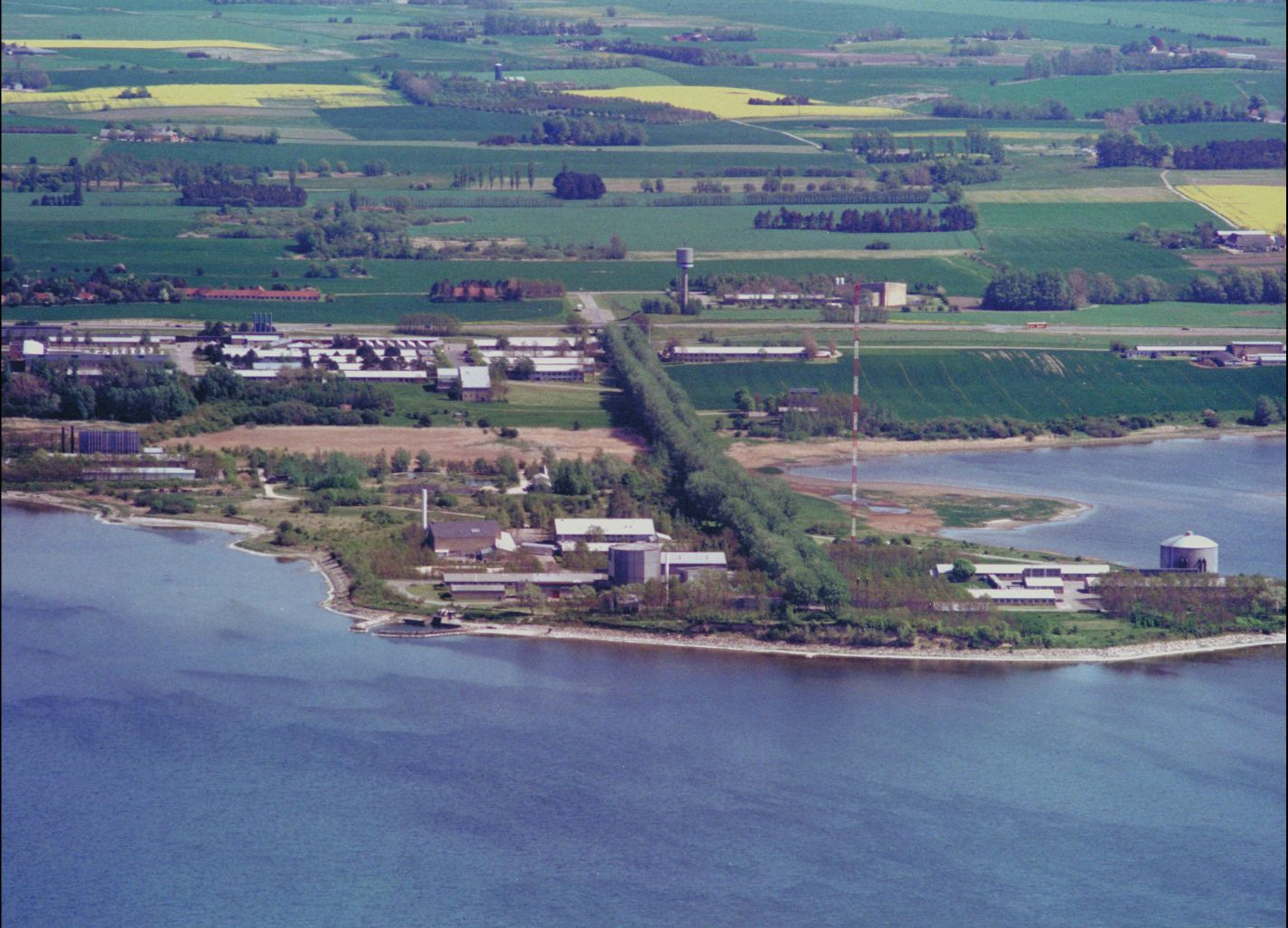
The Risø research facilities

In the 1890s, 37% of Roskilde's economy was in crafts and manufacturing industry with only 15% in administration and services. By 1984, industry had dropped to 16% while services had risen to 57%. In 2002, services had reached 62%, leaving industry at 15% and trade and transport at 22%.

=== Companies ===
One of the largest employers in Roskilde is BEC (Bankernes EDB Central) who provide IT services to the financial sector. In July 2014, Novo A/S acquired Sonion, producing micro-acoustical components for hearing aids. Top-Toy A/S with up to 200 employees is a major Scandinavian toy importer and retailer based in Tune near Roskilde Airport. DLF-Trifolium A/S, a seed producer for the farming sector, has its headquarters in Roskilde with a workforce of over 50. Rambøll, the international Danish engineering consultancy, has recently concentrated its Zealand operations in Roskilde bringing 60 new jobs to the city.

Among the city's smaller companies are GPI (Glim Plastic Industri) established in 1987 producing plastic piping, Roskilde Galvanisering A/S, one of Denmark's leading galvanization companies, and Mathiesen A/S, a wholesaler of office equipment. Vestergaard Company A/S, an American firm which produces de-icing equipment and washing products for the aviation industry, has offices in Roskilde. The new city district of Musicon has already attracted 29 businesses in the area of culture and the creative arts, providing over 1,000 jobs.

Several food industries have their headquarters or production facilities in Roskilde, including: Chr. Hansen A/S, producing cultures for the dairy industry, DanÆg, eggs, the Scandinavian Pizza Company, and Stryhns, a cold cuts and meat paste producer with over 100 on the payroll.

=== Research parks ===
There are a number of research institutes in the city including Risø, promoting sustainable energy, which is now part of The Technical University of Denmark. The research facilities are being extended over an additional 50 ha (120 acres) to cover the clean technology area liable to provide up to 4,000 more jobs. The CAT (Center for Avanceret Teknologi) research park is also part of the university working mainly in the areas of wind energy and biotechnology. In the public sector, the Accident Investigation Board Denmark formerly had its head office in Roskilde.

=== Tourism ===
An important component of the city's economy is tourism which currently accounts for DKK 1.2 billion (US$200 million) per annum. Provisional figures show an increase of 16.6% in overnight stays for 2014. The cathedral and the Viking Ship Museum attract more than 100,000 visitors per year although 20 years ago there were some 200,000 visits to the cathedral.

The city is also popular with shoppers, having received Denmark's Best Shopping City Award in 2012. In addition to a wide variety of shops and restaurants along its two downtown pedestrian streets, Algade and Skomagergade, Roskilde's shopping centre RO's Torv on Københavnsvej to the east of the city houses 70 stores under one roof.

One of the oldest restaurants in Roskilde is the Raadhuskælderen, in a building dated to 1430. Also of note is La Brasserie on Algade, the Gimle Musikcafe on Ringstedgade, which is an English-style pub-restaurant with live music, and Restaurant Toppen at the top of an 84 metres (276 ft) water tower, built in 1961, with fine views of the town. The 76-room Hotel Prindsen has foundations which date to 1695. It has been a hotel for over 100 years and is decorated in the Nordic style with wooden floors and contains the large luxury Hans Christian Andersen suite. Scandic Hotel Roskilde is a 98-room chain-run hotel established in 1989, with a restaurant serving Danish and international cuisine. The thatched-roof Svogerslev Kro is an 18-room inn dated to 1727 in the Svogerslev area, about 2.5 miles to the west of Roskilde's centre.

== Cityscape ==
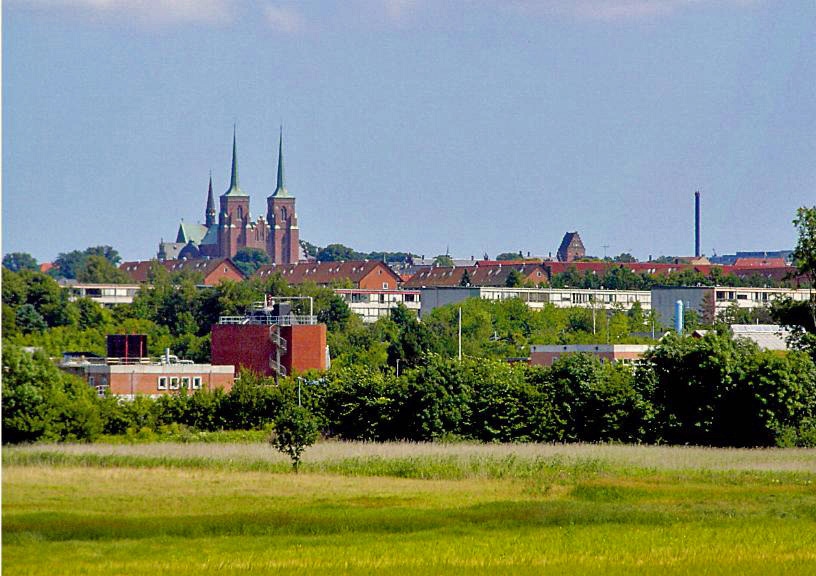
Roskilde viewed from the west

The old town of Roskilde is centred around the main square, Stændertorvet, just south of the cathedral. The original street plan is preserved in nearby Skomagergade, Algade and Hestetorvet although most of the buildings were rebuilt after serious fires in the 18th century. The area is flanked to the north by two large parks, Byparken and Folkeparken, which stretch down to Roskilde Fjord.

The old town is bordered to the south by the railway and main station, beyond which there are commercial buildings and apartment blocks. The residential areas of Himmelev and Veddelev to the east and north of the city have grown up around former villages. More recently, with the establishment of Roskilde University even further to the east beyond the ring road, the district of Trekroner is in full development, expected to attain some 3,500 houses in the coming years.

One of the most exclusive residential districts of the city, Sankt Jørgensbjerg, covers the hilly area to the northwest, bordered by the fjord. Initially a fishing village dating back to the Viking era, it became part of Roskilde in 1938.

Finally, Roskilde Municipality is developing the innovative Musicon quarter to the south of the city in an area of 25 ha (62 acres) where a cement factory once stood. Located in the same district as the fairgrounds used for the Roskilde Festival, there are medium-term plans for establishing creative companies and housing for young people in the area. A large rock museum named "Ragnarock" opened in April 2016.

== Landmarks ==
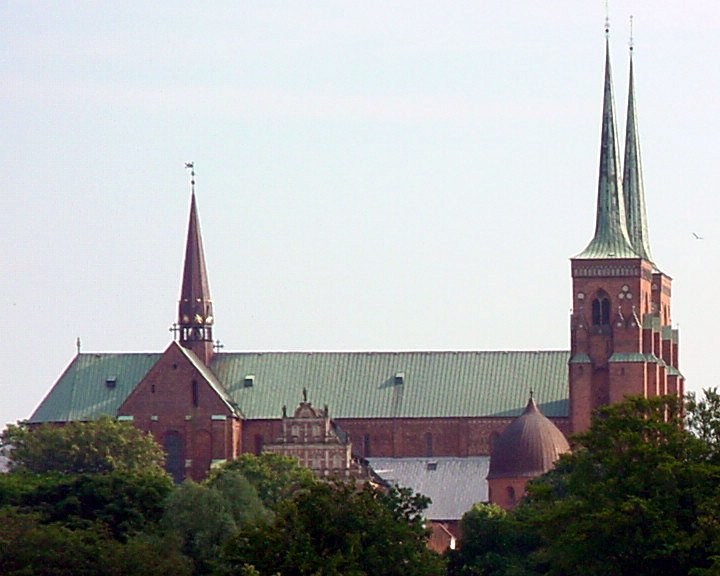
Roskilde Cathedral

=== Roskilde Cathedral ===
Located on the site of a 10th-century wooden church, the cathedral was built in the 12th and 13th centuries when the Romanesque style was influenced by Gothic trends from northern France. It was the first Gothic cathedral in Scandinavia to be built of brick, resulting in the spread of this style throughout northern Europe. With its 39 royal tombs, the cathedral is to this day the burial site for Danish monarchs. Since 1995, it has been listed as a UNESCO World Heritage Site, encouraging some 100,000 tourists to visit it each year. The cathedral houses a museum on its upper floor, tracing the building's history. A working church, it also hosts concerts throughout the year.

=== Roskilde Palace ===
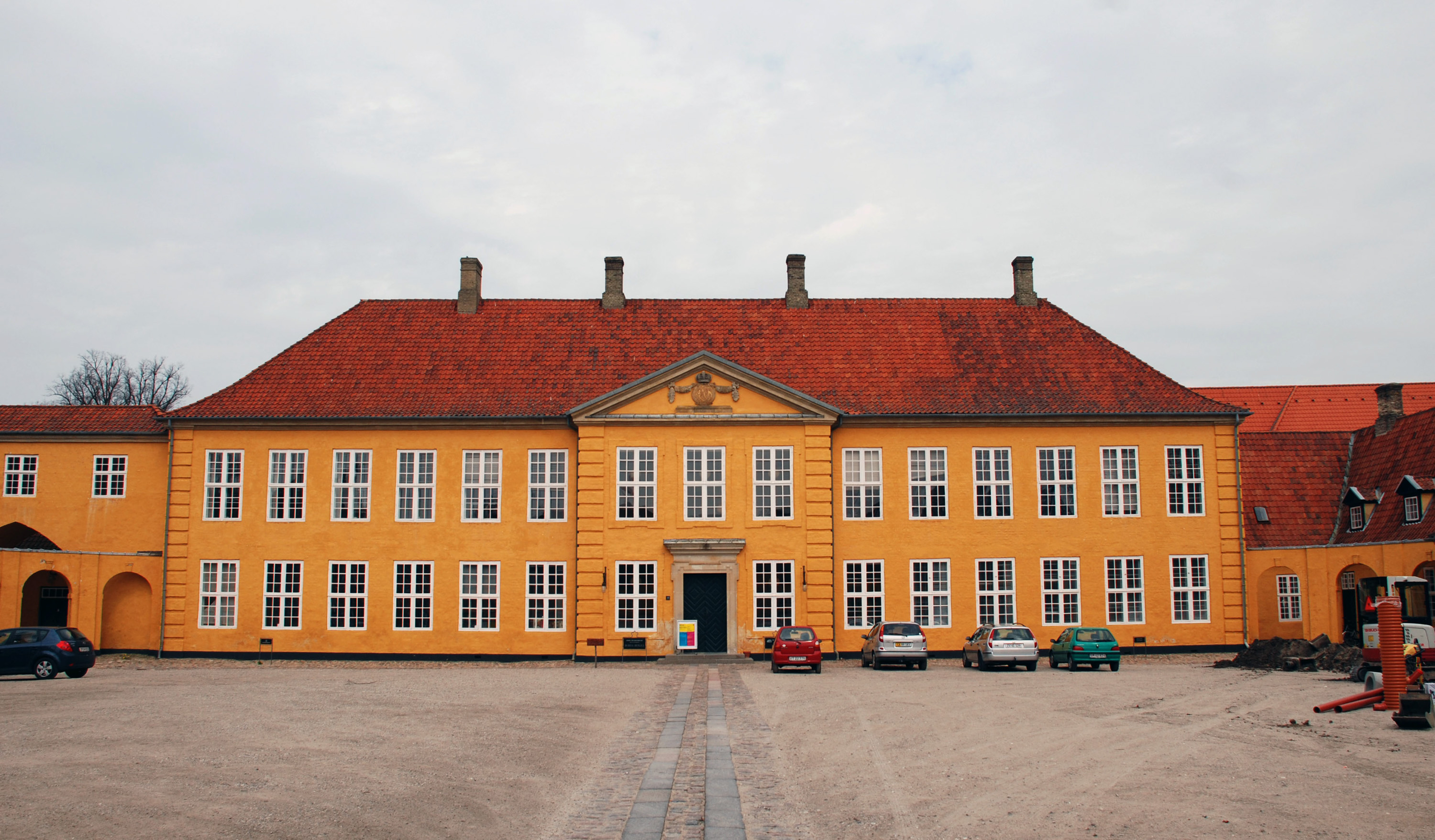
Roskilde Palace

Adjacent to the cathedral is Roskilde Palace, built from 1733 to 1736 on the site of the former residence of the bishops of Roskilde. It was used by members of the royal family when they were in the city or attended funerals. Today it houses the Museum of Contemporary Art. During the English siege of Copenhagen in 1807, the mansion served as headquarters of General Wellesley, the future Duke of Wellington. Built in the Baroque style with yellow-rendered masonry and red tile roofing, the four-winged complex consists of a two-storey main wing, two one-storey lateral wings and a curved gate wing opening onto the Stændertorvet. The four wings are connected by curving galleries. Facing the courtyard, the façade of the main wing has pilasters and a median risalit tipped by a triangular pediment decorated with the royal coat of arms.

=== Roskilde Convent ===
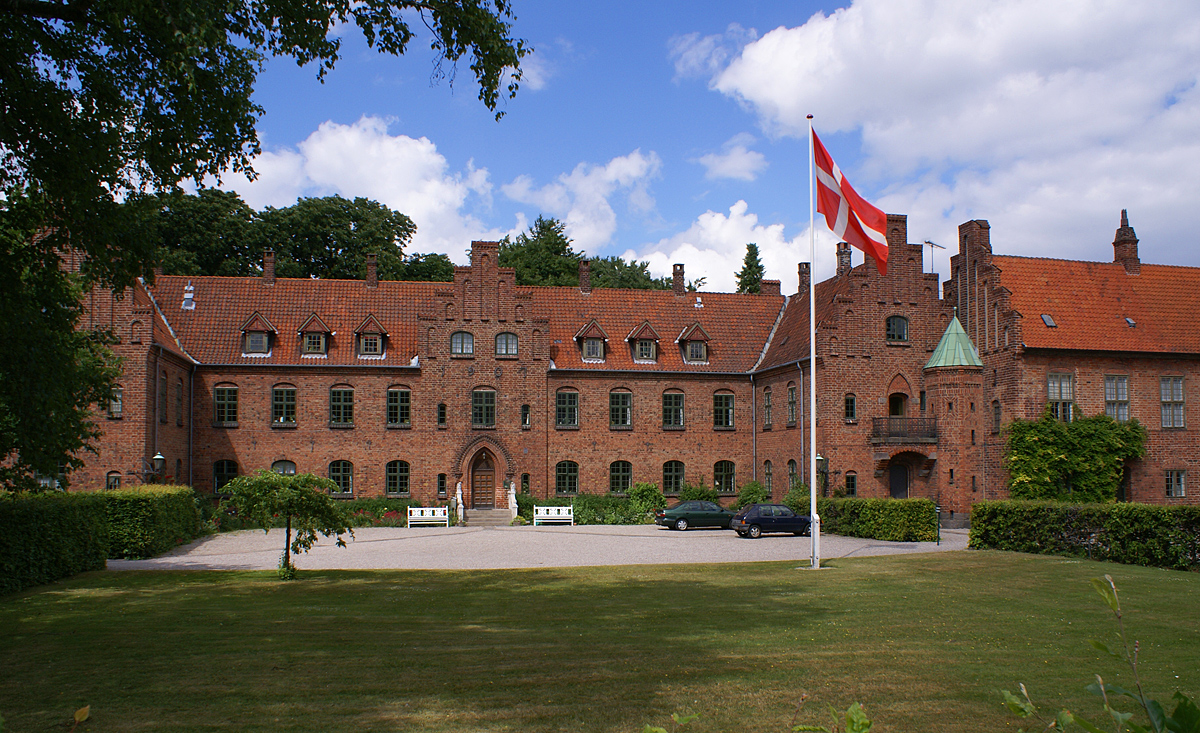
Roskilde Convent

Roskilde Convent is on the site of the former St Catherine's Priory from the mid-13th century which belonged to the Dominican friars until it was dissolved after the Danish Reformation. A private manor house (Sortebrødregaard or Blackfriars Manor) was built on the site in 1565 which in 1699 became a convent for women of high rank, the first of its kind in Lutheran Denmark. The building now houses a collection of 150 paintings from the 16th to 18th centuries as well as period furniture. The convent chapel has a carved altarpiece and pulpit.

=== Roskilde Museum ===
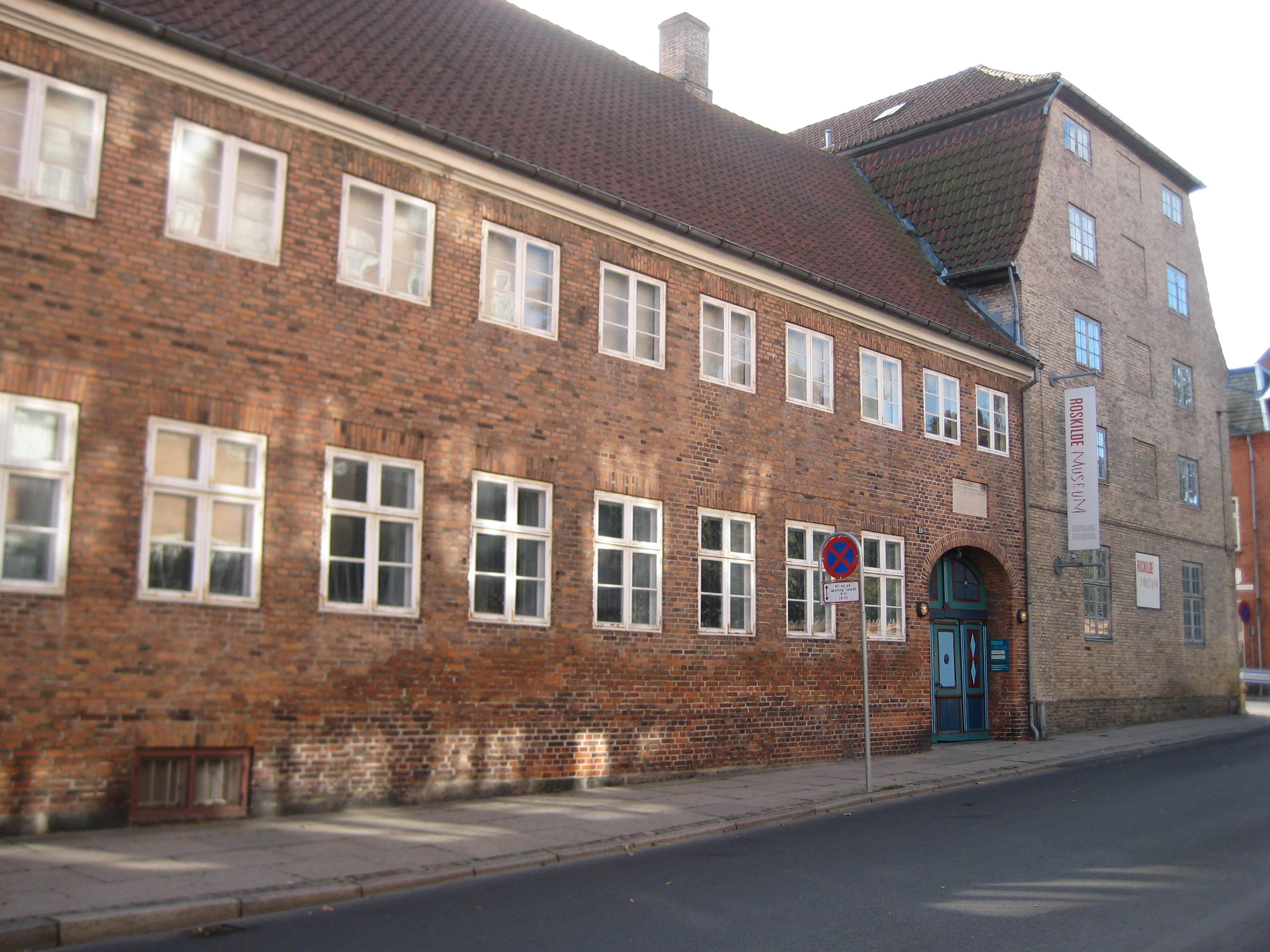
The Sugar House

Roskilde Museum is a local history museum, run by the municipalities of Roskilde, Frederikssund and Lejre. The main branch in Roskilde, on the corner of Sankt Olsgade and Sankt Olsstræde, is based in two listed buildings, Sukkerhuset (the Sugar House) and Liebes Gård (Liebe House), a former sugar refinery and merchant's house. The Sugar House was built by a consortium led by Johan Jørgen Holst as a facility for the processing of raw sugar from the Danish West Indies. Jacob Borch constructed Liebe House in 1804 on the site next to the sugar factory. It replaced a modest house with timber framing and a straw roof dating from the 17th century. The building takes its name from the Liebe family who owned the property for two generations later in the century. On the occasion of his death in 1900, Liebe left the entire building complex to Roskilde Municipality. In 1908, the Sugar House came into use as a fire station. Roskilde Local History Museum was founded on 12 November 1929 on the ground floor of the Liebe House. When the fire station moved to new premises in 1989, Roskilde Museum took over the Sugar House. The museum has exhibits from prehistory, through the Viking Era and the Middle Ages to modern times. The Museum of Tools, housed in separate premises, contains a collection of tools used by craftsmen such as wheelwrights, carpenters, shoemakers and wood carvers from around 1850 to 1950.

=== Viking Ship Museum ===
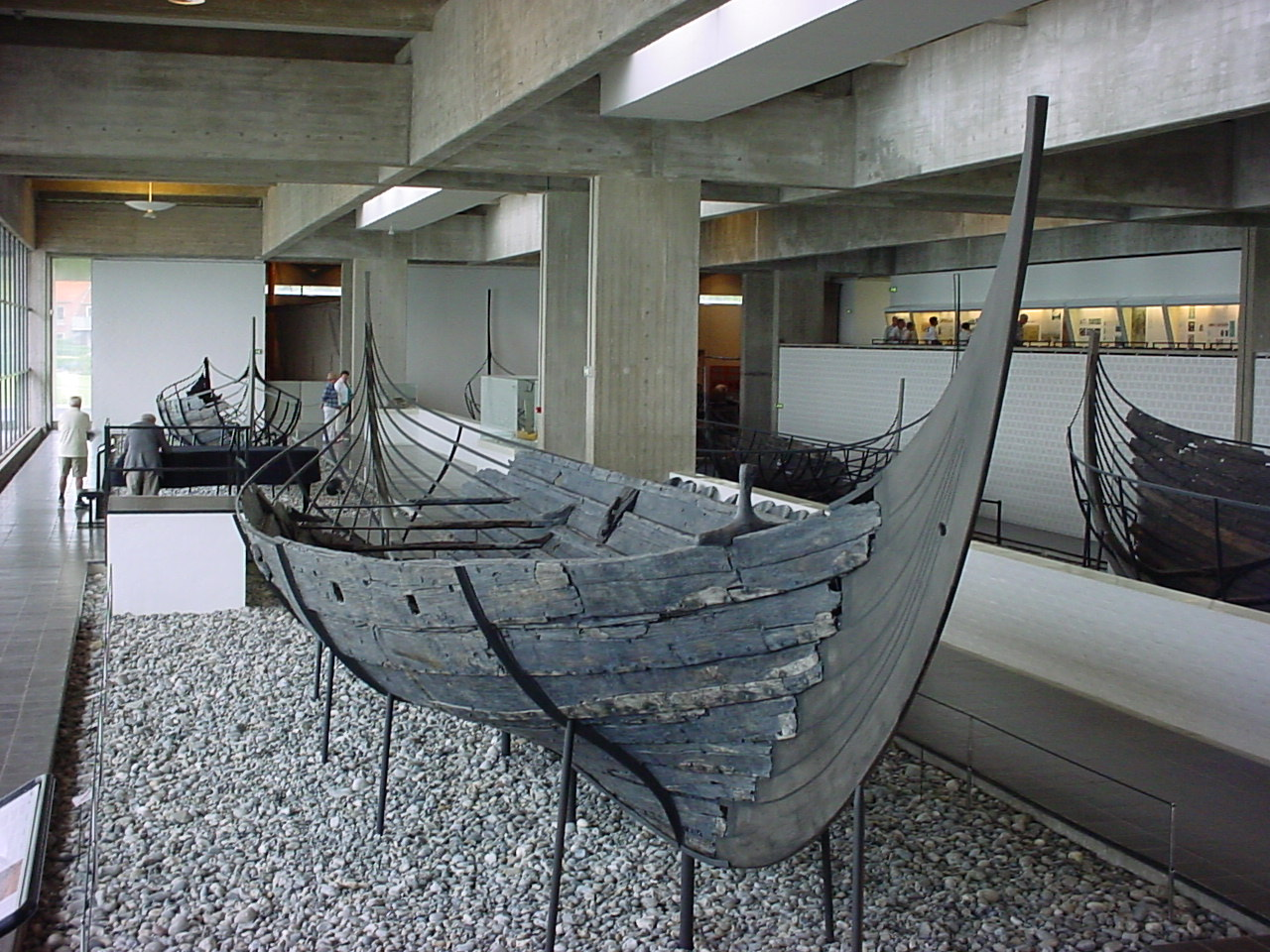
Viking Ship Museum

A major attraction in the city is the Viking Ship Museum (Vikingeskibsmuseet) located alongside Roskilde Fjord. The centrepieces of its collection are the well-preserved remains of five 11th-century Viking ships, excavated from the fjord some 20 km (12 mi) north of the city in the late 1960s. The ships were scuttled there in the 11th century to block a navigation channel, protecting the city, then the Danish capital, from seaborne assault. The five Viking ships represent several distinct classes, such as the Longship and Warship, and smaller fishing and ferry boats. The ships on display range from 10 feet (3 m) to 50 feet (15 m) in length. The museum also undertakes research in experimental archaeology centred on Viking shipbuilding and seaworthiness. The boatyard, which also forms part of the museum, safeguards the Viking boat-building tradition by building and exhibiting full-scale ships on site.

=== Ragnarock Museum ===
On April 29, 2016, the Ragnarock museum for pop, rock and ungdomskultur (youth culture) in Roskilde was inaugurated by Frederik, Crown Prince of Denmark. The 3,100 square-meter museum, designed by the Dutch architectural firm MVRDV and by the Danish architecture firm COBE Architects, presents and disseminates youth culture and rock music from the 1950s to the present, both as a means of communication and to enhance socialization between people from different cultures and social backgrounds.

=== Historic churches ===
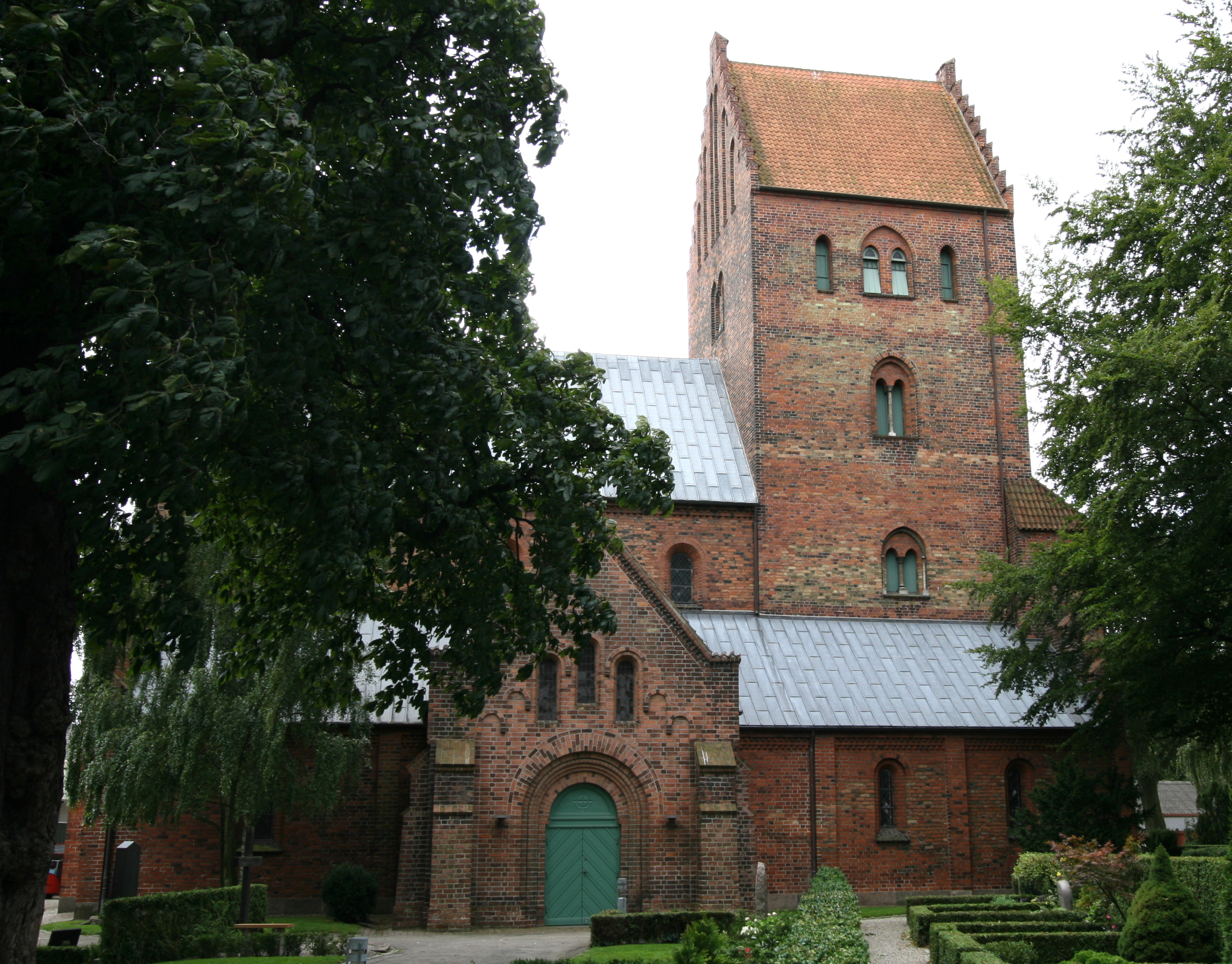
Old Church of Our Lady

The Old Church of Our Lady (Gammel Vor Frue Kirke) is an 11th-century stone church on the southern outskirts of the old town. It is the only surviving travertine basilica in Denmark with a high central nave opening onto two lower lateral aisles. Its carved altarpiece and pulpit from the 1620s are from Brix Michgell's Roskilde workshop. The church was attached to a convent for women of rank until the Reformation. It has been called the "Old" Church of Our Lady since 1907 when a new Church of Our Lady was built to the south of the city.

There are two other historic churches in central Roskilde. St Ib's is located below the cathedral plateau near the harbour. Built in travertine around 1100, the Romanesque building was once richly decorated in frescos, remains of which can be seen on the rear wall. It is no longer a functioning church. St Jørgensbjerg Church stands on a little hill to the northwest of the old town, overlooking the fjord. With a nave and chancel in travertine dating from c. 1080, it is Denmark's oldest preserved stone building. It features a carved pulpit from 1616. The Sankt Laurentii Church Tower is all that remains of the Romanesque Sankt Laurentii Church, built of travertine in the 13th century. It was torn down after the Reformation leaving only the tower which was built at the beginning of the 16th century and now forms part of the former town hall on Stændertorvet. It contains a museum where archaeological finds from 1998 can be seen.

=== Roskilde Jars ===
The three huge Roskilde Jars (Roskildekrukkerne) stand in a shallow water basin on the square outside the main railway station. They are 5 m (16 ft) in height and together weigh about 24 tons. The jars are the work of the Danish abstract sculptor Peter Brandes (born 1944). They were commissioned by Elsebeth Stryhn of Stryhns Leverpostej, a local meat paste company, and presented to the city in 1998 on the occasion of Roskilde's 1,000th anniversary.

=== Roskilde Festival ===
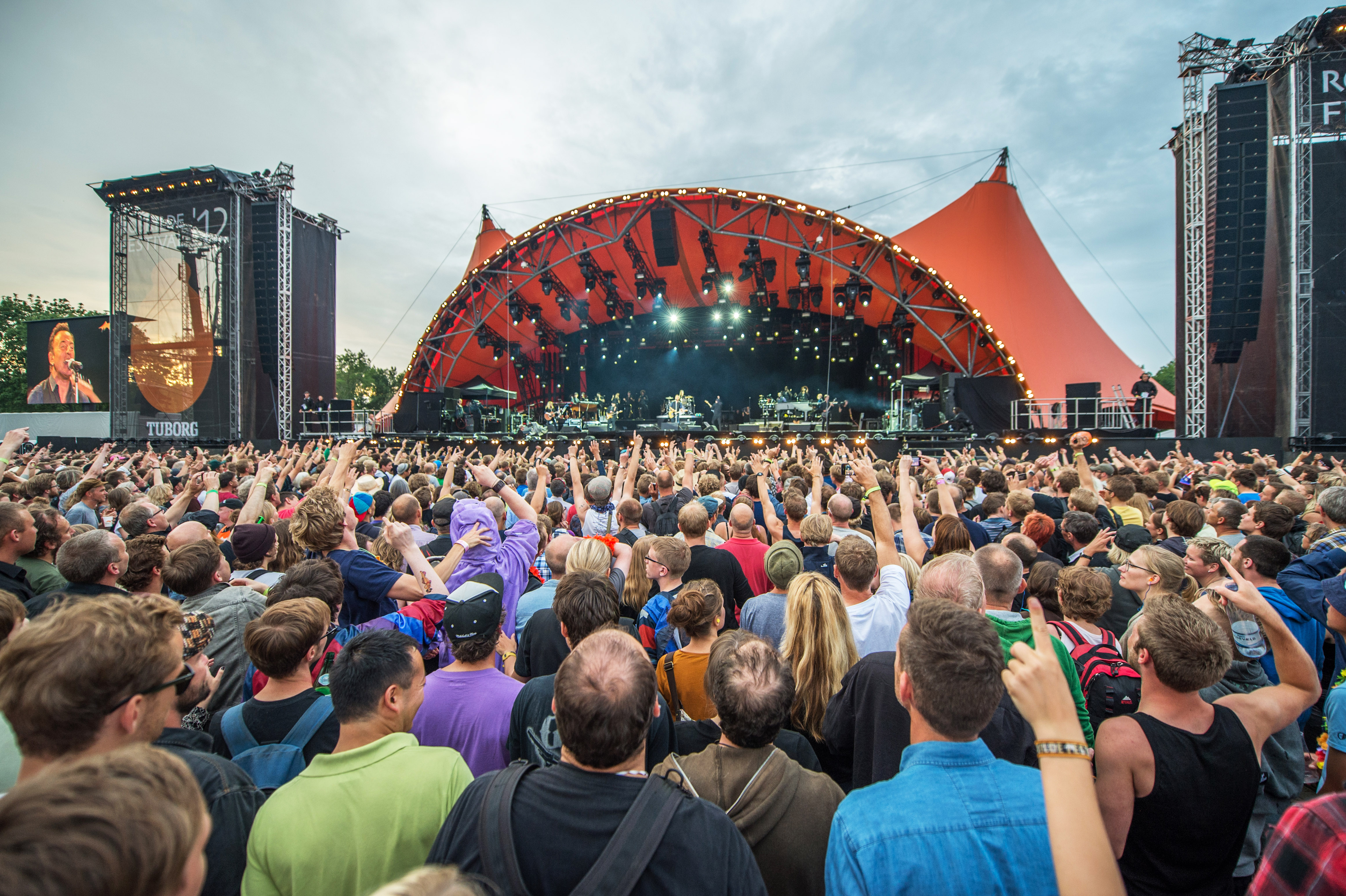
Roskilde Festival (2012)

Since it was first held in 1971, the Roskilde Festival, a rock music festival, has been held annually on the fairgrounds south of the city centre. It has grown to become one of the biggest music festivals in Scandinavia, with a turnout of around 80,000 every year. It features a diverse selection of music, including rock, metal, hip-hop, electronica, dance, and world music. All profits from the festival are donated to charities. The fairgrounds are also the site of regionally popular agricultural and animal exhibitions, and large flea markets.

== Education and sport ==
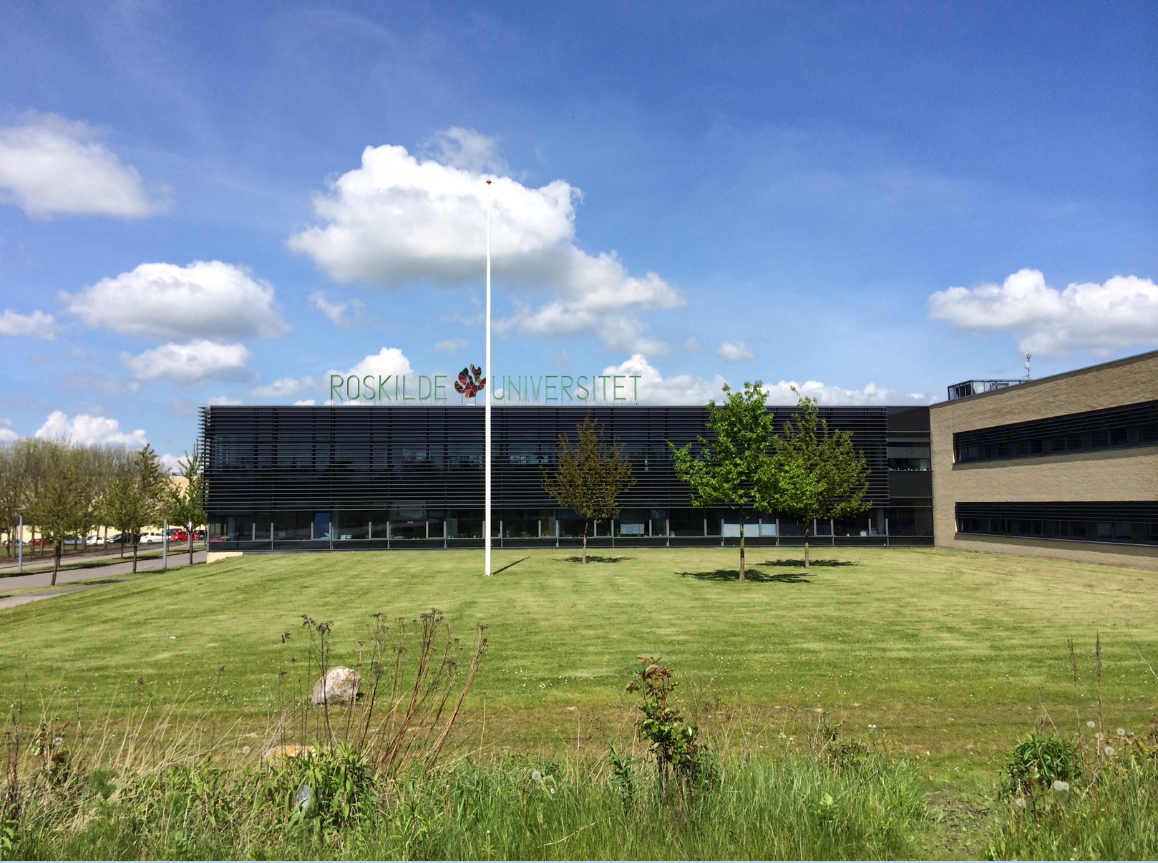
Roskilde University

Roskilde University (Danish: Roskilde Universitet, RUC) was founded in 1972. The university is on the eastern outskirts of Roskilde, in the Trekroner district (named after a signalman's cabin on the Roskilde-Copenhagen line). RUC hosts students from around the world. Roskilde University has on-campus dormitory style housing and apartments but many students commute from Copenhagen. In 2013, there were about 7,600 students, 630 teaching staff and 380 technical and administrative personnel. Designed by Preben Hansen (1908–1989), the university buildings were first brought into use in 1972.

Founded around 1020 to educate priests for the cathedral, Roskilde Cathedral School is possibly the oldest school in Denmark. Initially located close to the cathedral, it moved into larger premises in 1969 to accommodate an increasing number of pupils (currently over 1,300). The Danish Meat Trade College (Slagteriskolen), founded in 1964, is a non-profit institution offering vocational training courses in industrial slaughter, retail butchering, sausage making, nutrition and the meat service sector. Training is also offered to kitchen staff, waiters, cooks and bakers. The school employs about 150 teachers and supporting staff. Courses are also available for international students. There is a hostel with accommodation for some 200 students.

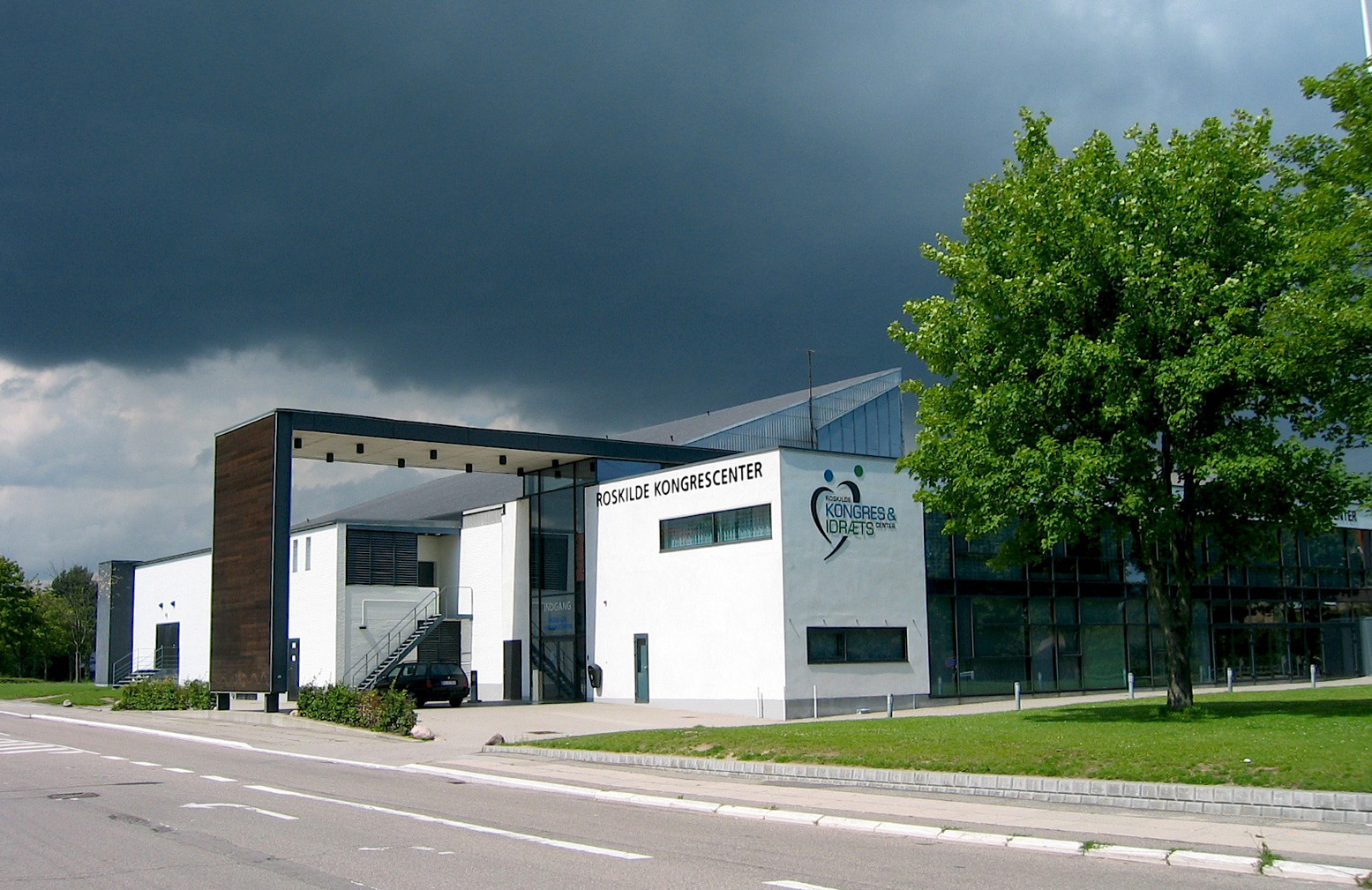
Roskilde Congress & Sports Centre

There are eleven public primary schools in the municipality split up between eleven school districts. Six gymnasiums (including Roskilde Cathedral School and Roskilde Gymnasium) offer Upper Secondary School Exit Examinations, Higher Preparatory Examinations, Higher Commercial Examination Programme and Higher Technical Examination Programme. There are many adult education, technical and trade schools in addition to the gymnasiums. Roskilde University Library (RUB) is a research library serving the students and staff at the university.

On the sports front, Roskilde is home to the FC Roskilde football club which play in the Danish 1st Division, the country's second highest league. Their home stadium is Roskilde Idrætspark with a capacity of 6,000. The city's rugby club, Roskilde Vikings RK, forms part of the Vor Frue Idrætsforening which also has facilities for badminton, soccer and gymnastics. Members of the rowing club, Roskilde Roklub, have distinguished themselves at the Olympic Games and other recent championships. The Roskilde Congress & Sports Centre provides facilities for sporting events accommodating up to 3,500 spectators. It is home to the Roskilde Handball Club.

In 1955 a motor racing circuit called the Roskilde Ring was built in an abandoned gravel quarry. The circuit was just 670 metres in length, being extended to 1.38 km in 1957. The circuit had no straight and all of the corners were banked. The Danish Grand Prix for Formula Two cars was held at the circuit every year from 1960 to 1968. The last meeting was held on the 22nd of September 1968, and the site is now a park.

== Transport ==
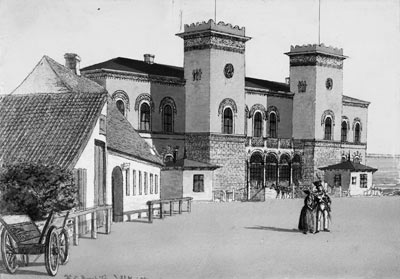
Roskilde railway station from the Horse Market (Hestetorvet) 1849

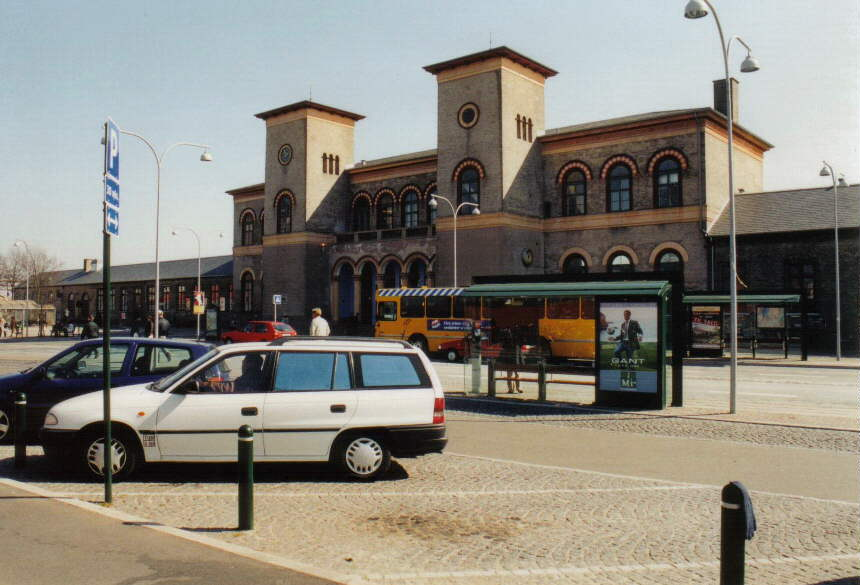
The station as it looks today

Roskilde is served by the Roskilde railway station. Its four platforms and seven tracks serve as a central hub connecting western and southern Zealand, the islands of Falster and Lolland, and Jutland to Copenhagen. Also within the municipality is the Trekroner station, serving Roskilde University and the developing residential areas to the east of Roskilde. Roskilde Station is the oldest railway station in Denmark still in operation and the first to be built of stone. The first train arrived from Copenhagen on 26 June 1847.

The principal road running through Roskilde is Danish national road 21, better known as Holbæk Motorway, which connects the city to the capital in the east.

The main airport for Roskilde is Copenhagen Airport which can be reached in about 40 minutes by train. Since April 1973, there has also been the small local Roskilde Airport, serving light aircraft for training, taxi, and flight instruction. There are plans to expand it for use by larger aircraft, possibly including discount international flights. The plans were approved, but lack of commitment from any carriers has postponed progress. The airport currently handles up to 100,000 operations (flights) per year, most of which are light aircraft operations associated with school flights. The airport is also home to a small Royal Danish Air Force detachment, maintaining a helicopter based search-and-rescue service covering Zealand and the Baltic Sea. Military passenger services have occasionally used the airport.

== Healthcare ==
The principal hospital in Roskilde is Roskilde Sygehus, founded in 1855. It currently has 437 beds for in-patients and several specialist wards, having been continuously modernized and expanded over the years. Recently physics facilities have been established in medical and hematological outpatient units, while in 2010 the cardiology laboratory was expanded for CAG/PCI. In addition, in 2011 a haematological and a urological ward were modernized and re-equipped. The hospital works in conjunction with Roskilde University in biomedical research, health services research, research assignments, direct research and pharmaceutical biology. It is also involved in a scientific co-operation with the Risø Research Centre.

Sankt Hans Hospital is a psychiatric hospital located in Roskilde but operated by the Capital Region of Denmark. With a history beginning in 1620, the hospital now has 180 beds and offers specialized treatment in the areas of forensic psychiatry and dual diagnosis.

== Notable people ==
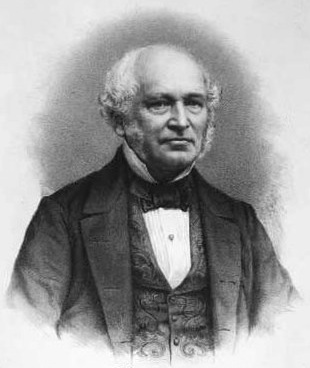
Peter Heering

=== Business ===
- Peter Heering (1792–1875), founder of Peter Heering, a liqueur flavored with cherries
- Arnold Busck (1871–1953), bookseller and publisher, founder of Arnold Busck A/S
- Jørgen Kastholm (1931–2007) furniture designer and academic
- Winnie Liljeborg, (born ca.1960) co-founder of Pandora AS, lives on Strandvejen
- Morten Lund (born 1972) entrepreneur

=== Culture ===
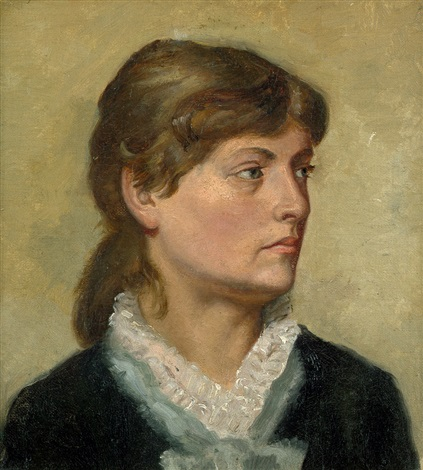
Sofie Holten

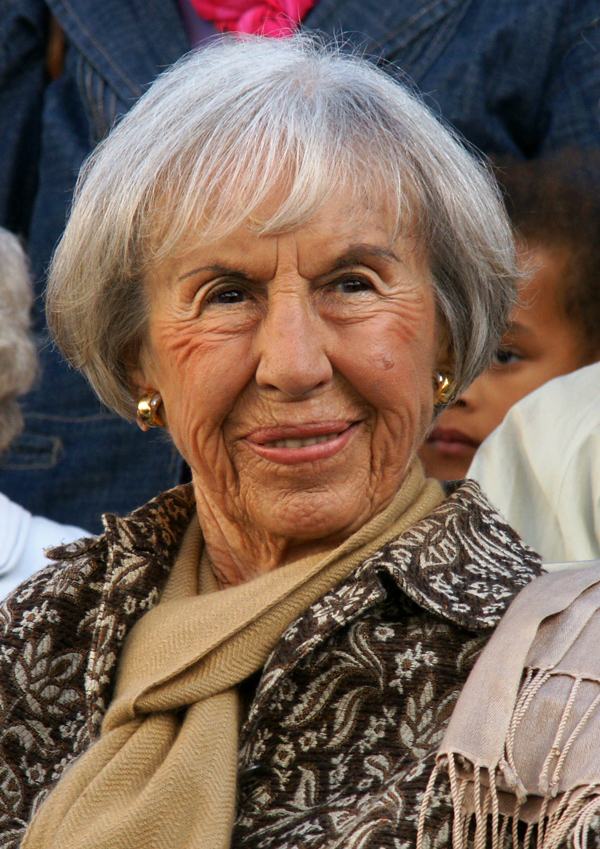
Lise Nørgaard, 2010

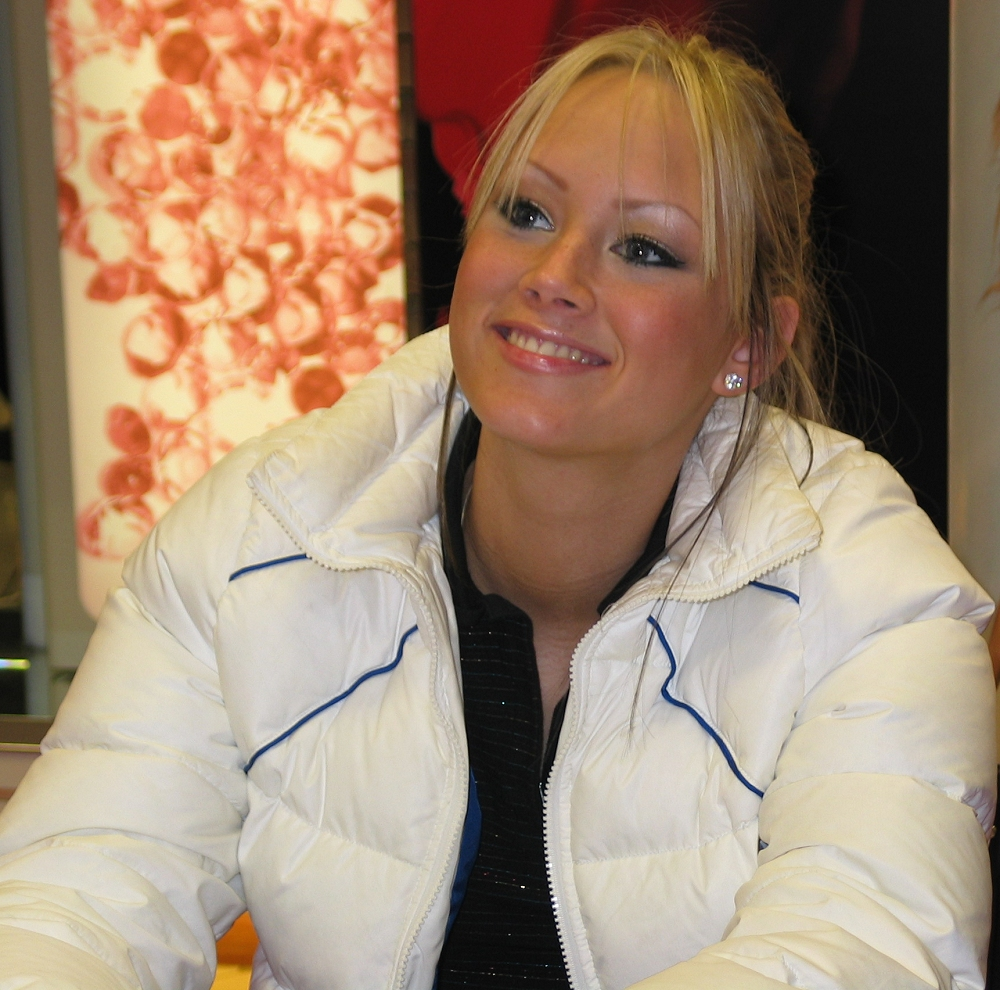
Natasha Thomas, 2009

- Peder Syv (1631–1702) philologist, folklorist and priest
- Brix Michgell (17th century) carpenter and wood carver of pulpits and altarpieces
- Anders Nielsen Hatt (17th century), created carved pulpits and altarpieces
- Ejler Andreas Jorgensen (1838–1876), a Danish-American landscape and portrait painter
- Carl Rohl-Smith (1848–1900) Danish-American sculptor of life-size and small bronzes
- Golla Hammerich (1854–1903), pianist
- L. A. Ring (1854–1933), painter, lived at Sankt Jørgensbjerg from 1923
- Clara Schønfeld (1856–1938), a Danish stage and film actress
- Sophie Holten (1858–1930) a Danish painter of portraits, flower paintings and genre works
- Pauline Thomsen (1858–1931), painter and art teacher
- Gustav Wied (1858–1914 in Roskilde), writer and satirical critic of society
- Hans Knudsen (1865–1947) artist, landscape paintings
- Sofie Madsen (1897–1982), educator of autistic children
- Aksel Schiøtz (1906–1975), a Danish tenor and later baritone; lieder singer
- Jørgen Beck (1914–1991) a Danish film actor
- Lise Nørgaard (1917–2023), a writer of humorous portrayals of Danish cultural life
- Willy Rathnov (1937–1999) a Danish film actor
- John Olsen, (1938–2019) sculptor, illustrator and painter
- Jørgen Boberg (1940–2009), a self-taught Surrealist Danish painter and illustrator
- Ib Michael (born 1945), a Danish novelist and poet of magic realism style
- Else Torp (born 1950) a Danish soprano
- Thomas Boberg (born 1960) a Danish poet and travel writer
- Ole Christian Madsen (born 1966), film-maker, director
- Thure Lindhardt (born 1974), actor, grew up in Roskilde
- Clemens Legolas Telling (born 1979) rapper, singer, music writer, actor
- Simon Sears (born 1984), actor, raised in Solrød Strand
- Natasha Thomas (born 1986) a Danish pop singer-songwriter
- Freja Beha Erichsen (born 1987) a Danish model, "Queen of Cool" with an androgynous look

=== Politics ===
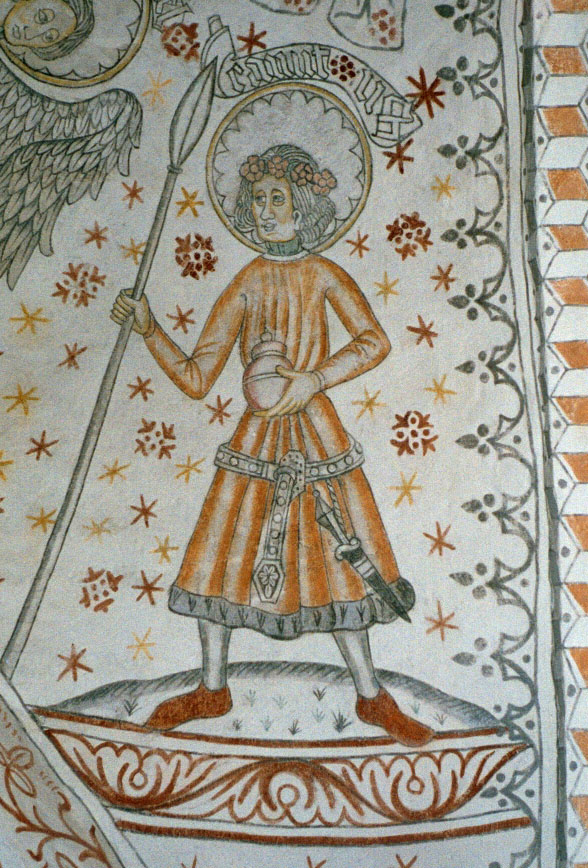
Knut Lavard

- Canute Lavard (1096–1131) Prince and first Duke of Schleswig
- Absalon (1128–1291), Bishop of Roskilde from 1158 to 1192
- Carl Christian Vilhelm Liebe (1820–1900) politician, speaker of Landstinget
- Louis Pio (1841–1894), a co-founder of the organized worker's movement in Denmark
- Carl Theodor Zahle (1866–1946), 5th Danish Prime Minister and co-founder of the Danish Social Liberal Party
- Slimane Hadj Abderrahmane (1973–2013) Danish citizen held in Guantanamo Bay
- Michael Aastrup Jensen (born 1976) politician
- Zenia Stampe (born 1979) politician, elected to the Folketinget in 2011
- Joy Mogensen (born 1980) a Danish politician, Mayor of Roskilde Municipality 2011 to 2019, Minister of Culture and Church since 2019

=== Sport ===
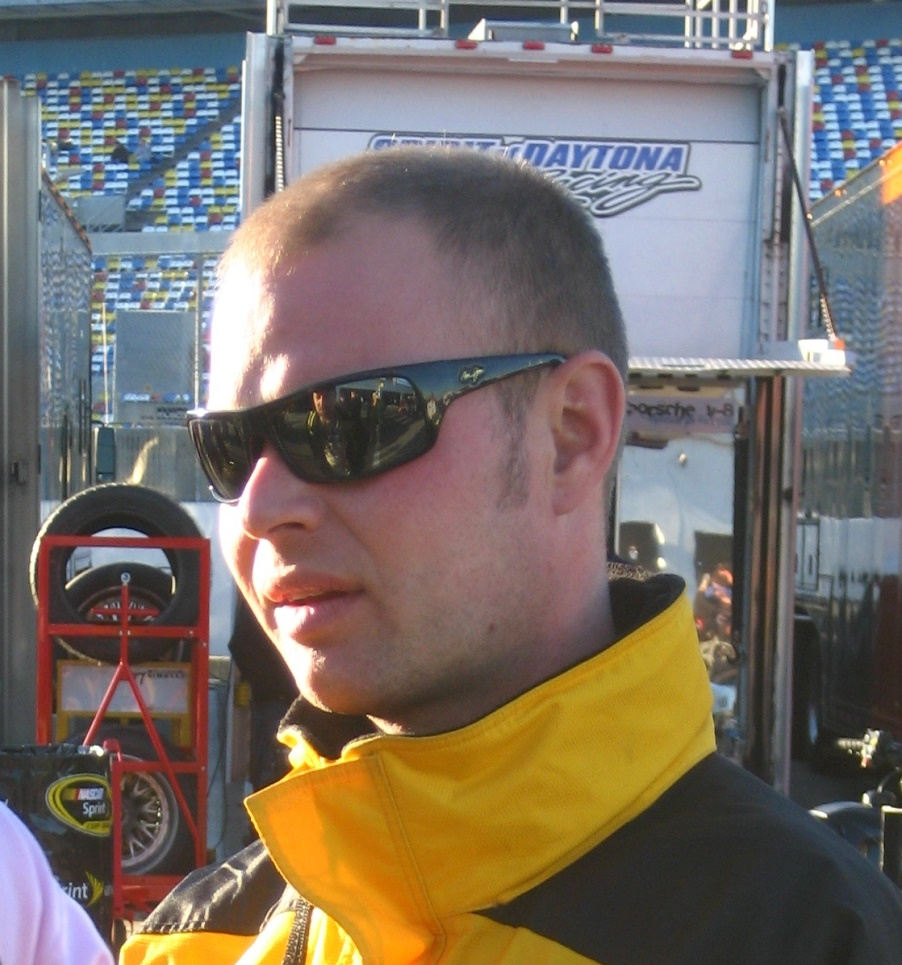
Jan Magnussen, 2010

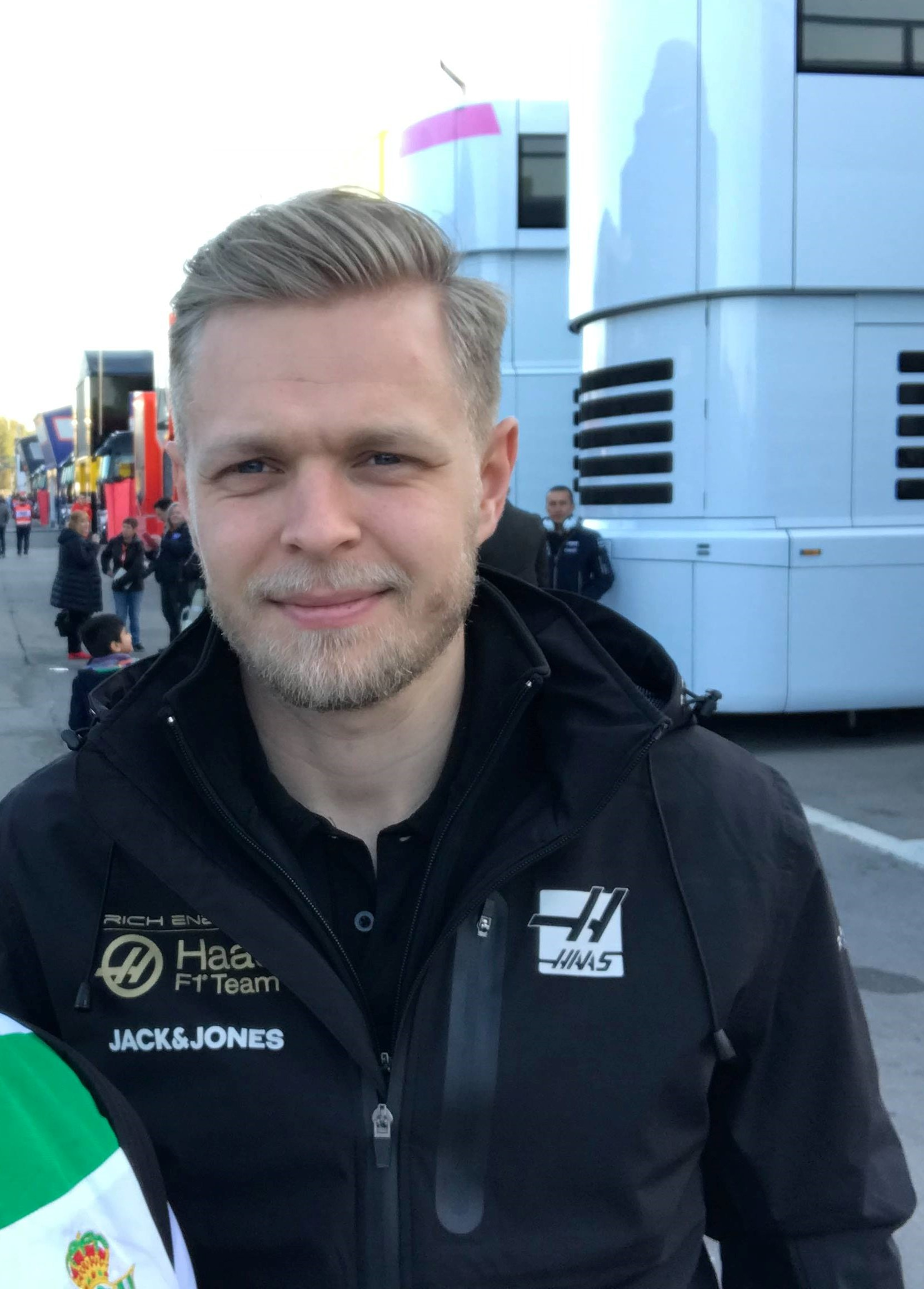
Kevin Magnussen, 2019

- Oskar Nørland (1882–1941) a Danish amateur footballer, played 14 games for Denmark and won two team silver medals at the 1908 and 1912 Summer Olympics
- Tage Henriksen (1925–2016) rower, team gold medallist at the 1948 Summer Olympics
- Finn Pedersen (1925–2012) rower, team gold medallist at the 1948 also competed at the 1956 Summer Olympics
- Carl-Ebbe Andersen (1929–2009), rower, team gold medallist at the 1948 Summer Olympics
- Jens Winther (born 1938), racing driver
- Reno Olsen (born 1947), racing cyclist, team gold medallist at the 1968 Summer Olympics
- Thomas Ebert (born 1973), rower, team gold medallist at 2004 and 2008 Summer Olympics
- Jan Magnussen (born 1973), racing driver and ex-F1 driver
- Rikke Olsen (born 1975) a retired badminton player, three time contender for Olympic bronze
- Peter Madsen (born 1978) a retired footballer with 275 club caps and 13 for Denmark
- Jesper Christiansen (born 1978) retired football goalkeeper with 348 club caps and a coach
- Carsten Mogensen (born 1983) badminton player, team silver medallist at the 2012 Summer Olympics
- David Ousted (born 1985) a Danish football goalkeeper with over 350 club caps
- Lasse Lindbjerg (born 1992) footballer and physiotherapist
- Kevin Magnussen (born 1992), racing driver currently competing in World Endurance Championship for BMW
- Dennis Lind (born 1993), racing driver
- Alba Hurup Larsen (born 2008), racing driver

=== Science ===
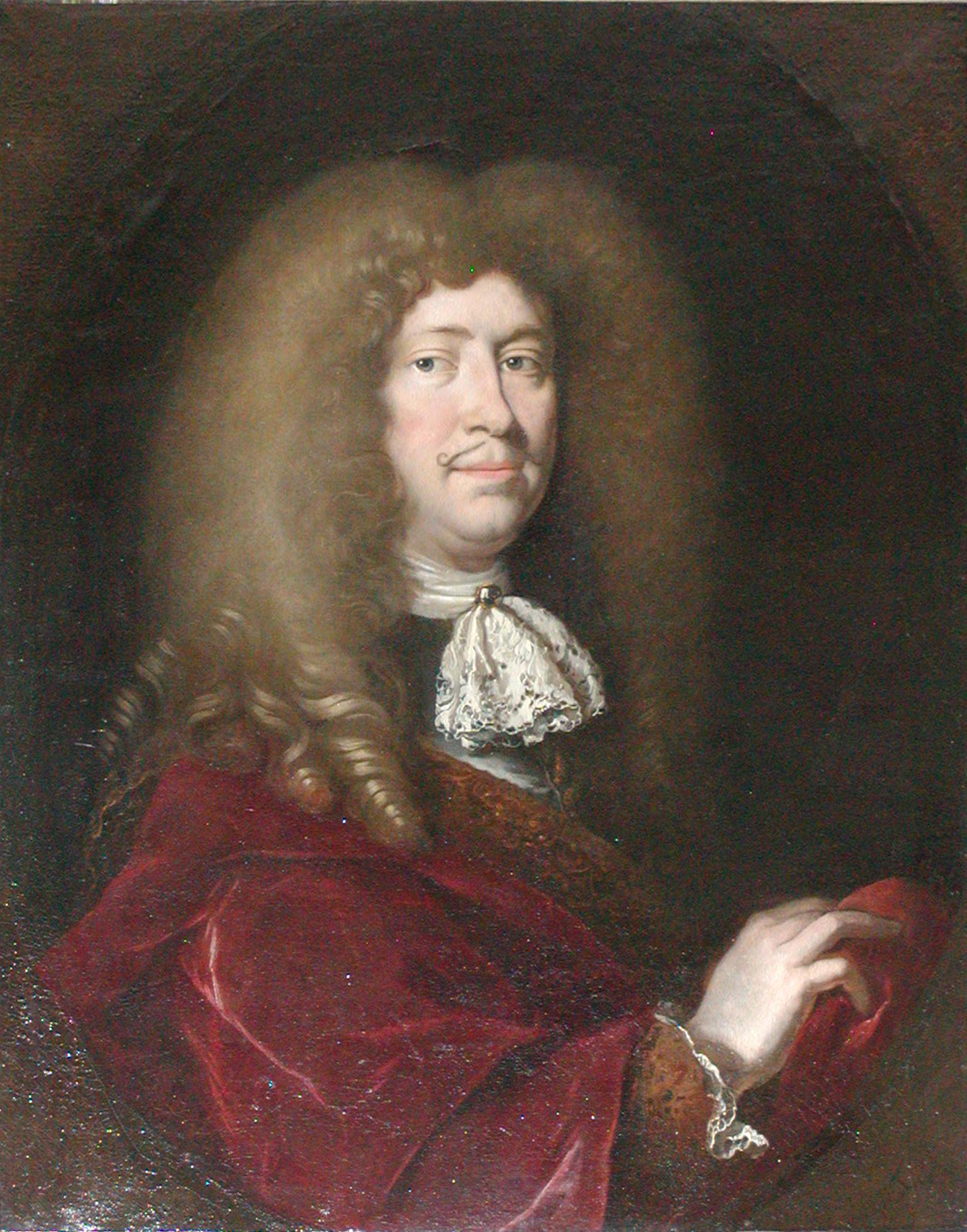
Rasmus Bartholin

- Rasmus Bartholin (1625–1698), scientist, physician, grammarian and astronomer
- Hans Egede Saabye (1746–1817) priest, missionary to Greenland and botanist
- Jacob Kornerup (1825–1913), archeologist and painter
- Ernst Østrup (1845–1917) botanist, phycologist, mainly working on diatoms
- Ejnar Hertzsprung (1873–1967 in Roskilde), chemist and astronomer
- Hans Helbæk (1907–1981) a Danish archaeologist and palaeobotanist
- Ada Bruhn Hoffmeyer (1910–1991) a Danish museum curator, writer and medieval weapons expert

=== Crime ===
- Peter Lundin (born 1972), convicted murderer

== See also ==
- Roskilde Festival
- Treaty of Roskilde
- Risø National Laboratory
