= Sankt Jørgensbjerg =

District of Roskilde

Coordinates: 55°39′N 12°04′E

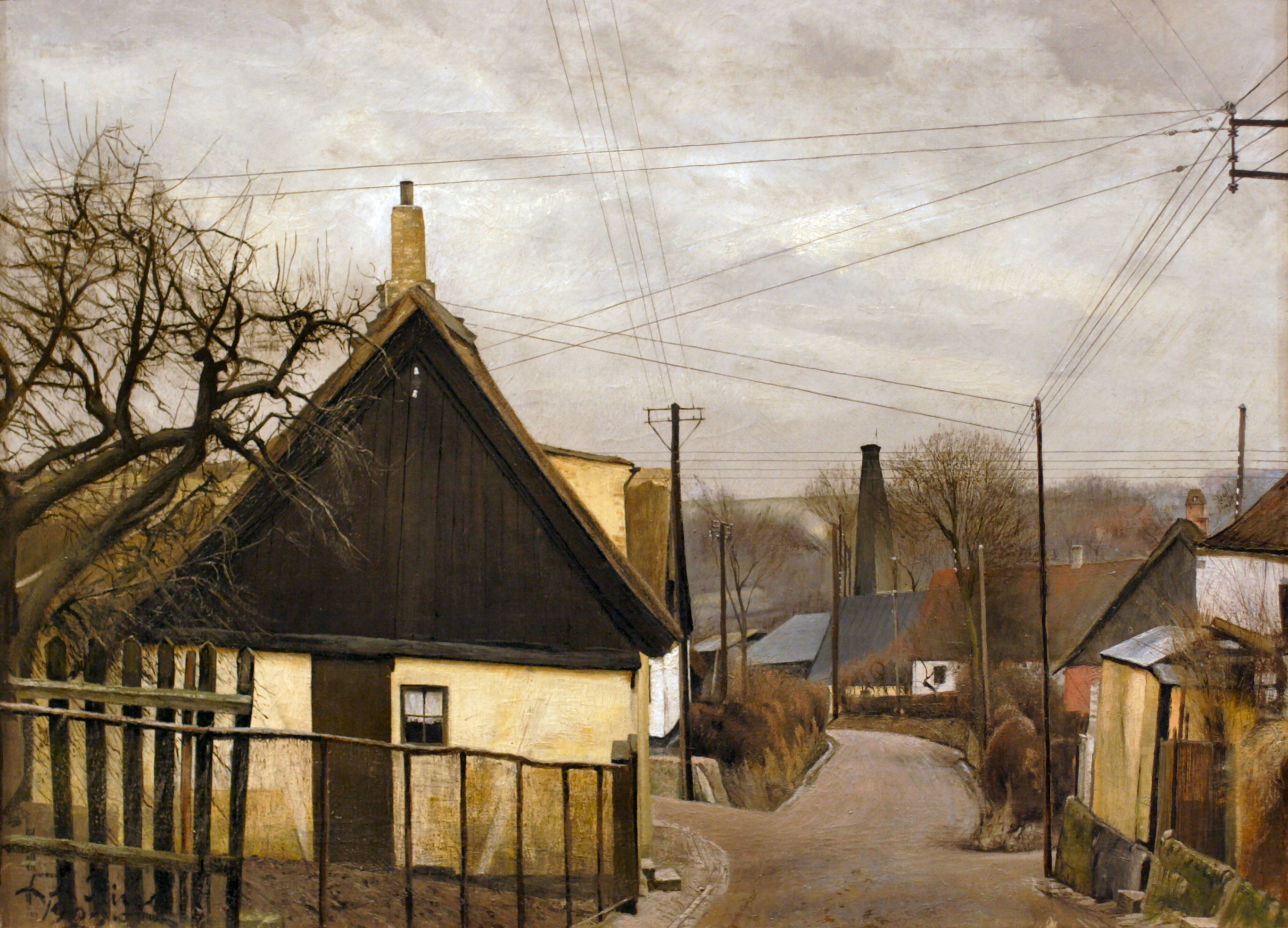
L.A. Ring: painting of Brøndgade, Sankt Jørgensbjerg (1927)

Sankt Jørgensbjerg is a district of Roskilde on the Danish island of Zealand. Initially a fishing village in its own right with a history dating to the Viking Age, it became part of Roskilde in 1938. Today it has become the most desirable district in the city.

== Notable people ==
- L.A. Ring (1854-1933), painter
- Sigrid Ring, née Kähler, ceramist and painter

== See also ==
- St Jørgensbjerg Church
