= Roskilde Fjord =

Fjord in Denmark

Coordinates: 55°50′00″N 12°02′50″E

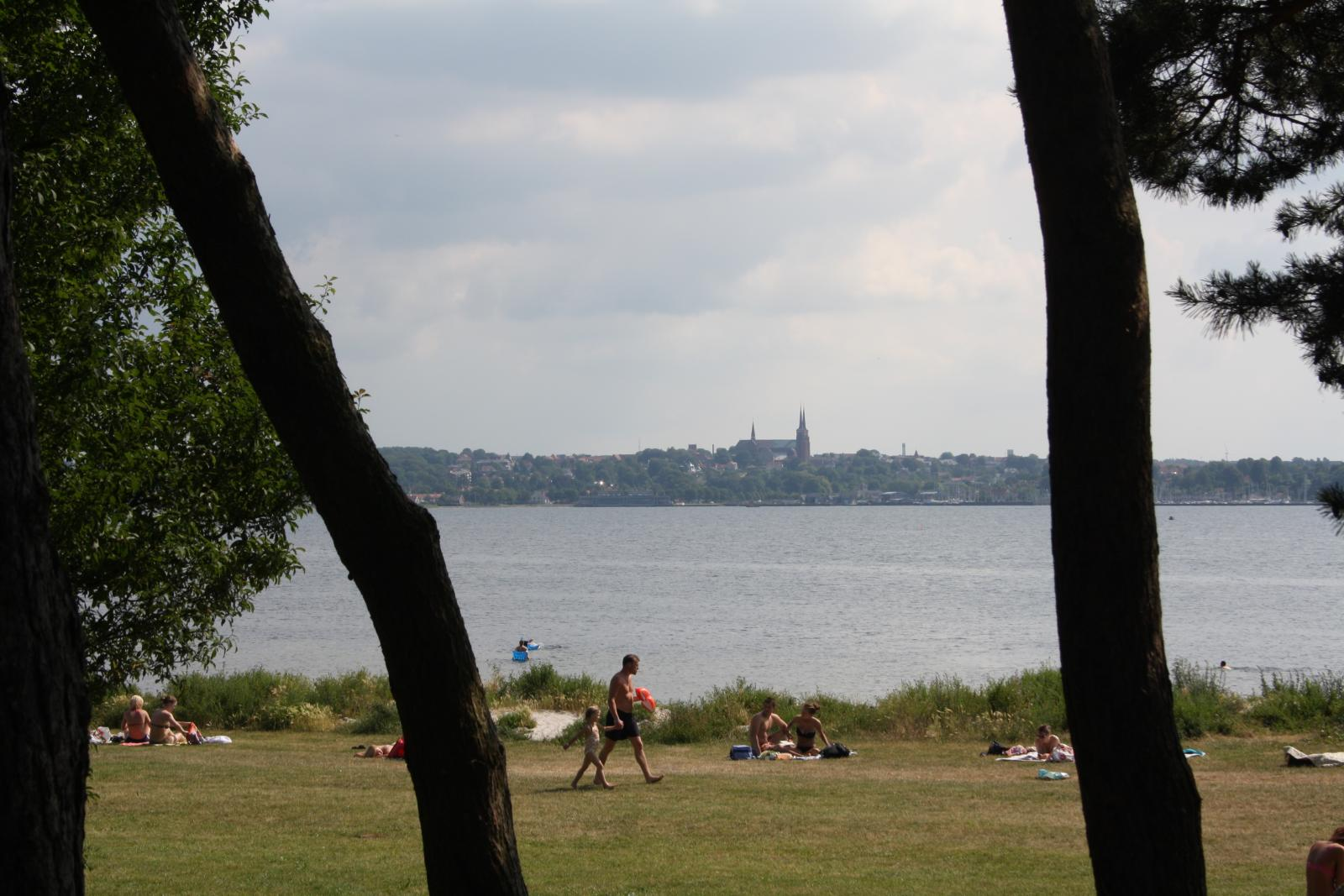
Roskilde Fjord with Roskilde Cathedral in the distance

Roskilde Fjord is the fjord north of Roskilde, Denmark. It is a long branch of the Isefjord.

== Cities ==
The cities Frederiksværk, Frederikssund, Jægerspris, Jyllinge and Roskilde (including Himmelev), (home to the famous Roskilde Festival), all have coastline at Roskilde Fjord. The image on this page shows the view of the fjord, as seen from Roskilde.

== Viking era ==
During the Viking era, circa 1000 AD, the people of Roskilde decided to sink a number of their ships in the fjord at Skuldelev, in an effort to prevent the Vikings from coming and raiding. Today, five ships have been discovered; during expansion of the museum that houses these finds, another nine were uncovered.

== See also ==
- Roskilde Roklub
