= Hanmann =

Hanmann is a surname. Notable people with the surname include:

- Charlotte Hanmann (born 1950), Danish photographer, painter and graphic artist
- Inger Hanmann (1918–2007), Danish artist

== See also ==
- Hamann
