= St Jørgensbjerg Church =

Church in Roskilde, Denmark

Coordinates: 55°38′58″N 12°04′33″E

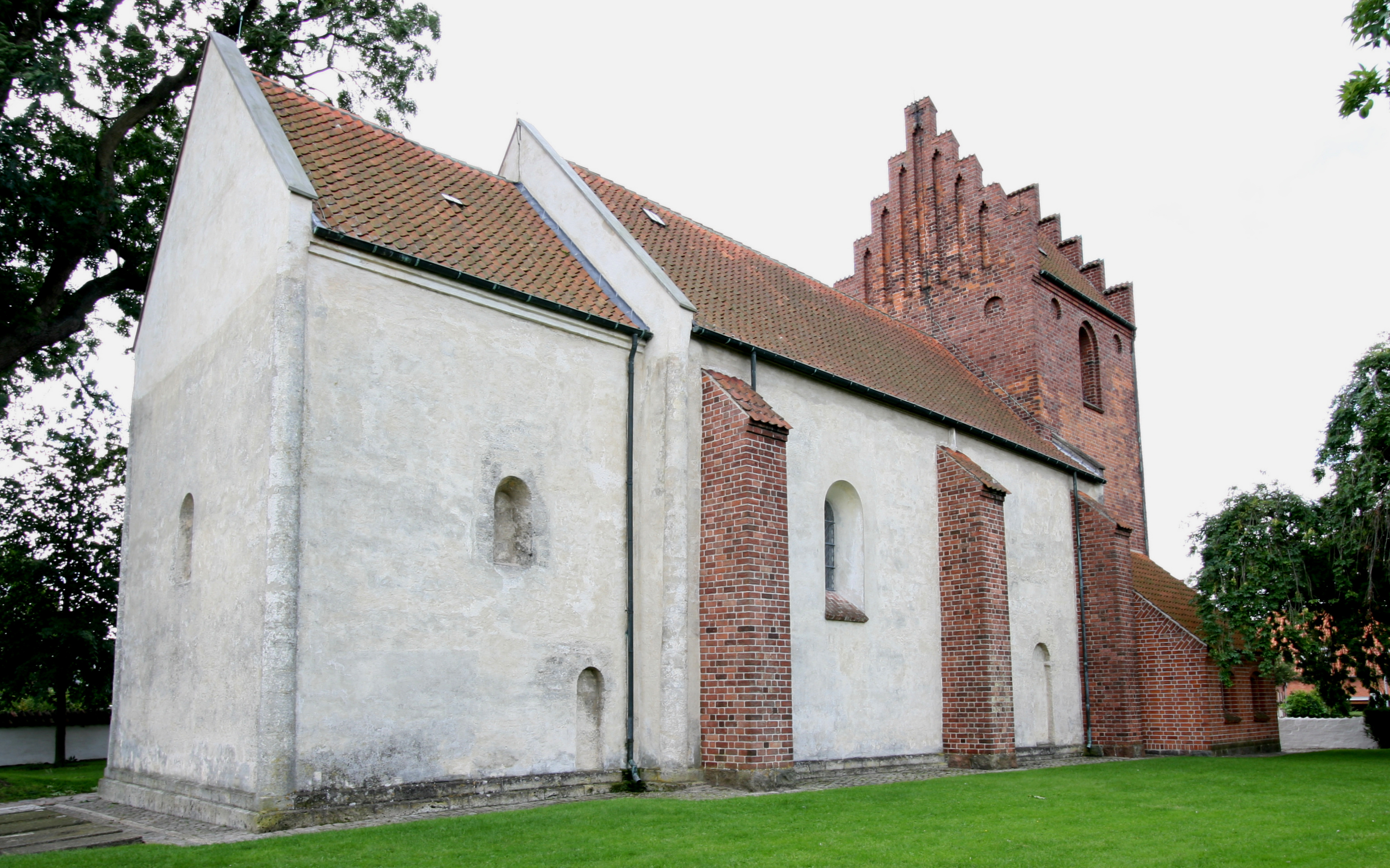
St Jørgensbjerg Church

Saint Jørgensbjerg Church (Danish: Sankt Jørgensbjerg Kirke) is a historic church in Roskilde on the Danish island of Zealand. With a nave and chancel in travertine limestone dating from c. 1080, it is Denmark's oldest preserved stone building.

== History and architecture ==
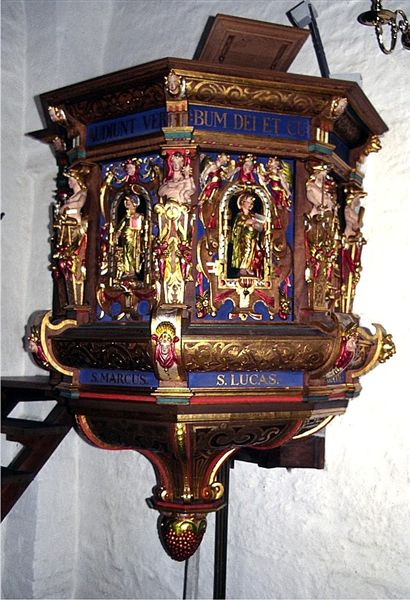
Carved pulpit (1616)

The church is located to the northwest of the old town on a little hill overlooking Roskilde Fjord. Archaeological excavations in connection with the church's restoration in the 1950s revealed that it stands on the site of an earlier stone church from c. 1025–30 with a chancel, nave and tower. Today's church was originally consecrated to St Clement, the patron saint of seafarers. The name St Jørgensbjerg ("St George's Hill") is first mentioned in 1253 when a Skt. Jørgens-gårde ("St George's Cemetery") was built north of the church to accommodate those in Roskilde who were suffering from the plague. Thereafter the hill became known as Jørgensbjerg which was also applied to the church.

The church consists of a chancel and nave from c. 1080 and a south-facing porch and west tower, both Late Gothic. The material is travertine limestone, worked into fairly large blocks on the outer wall but smaller inside. The nave is unusually slender measuring only 6.80 m (22.3 ft) across, almost exactly the same as its height. The original Romanesque windows have been preserved in the chancel but not in the nave.

In the 14th century, a vault was constructed above the nave and a Late Gothic tower was added, probably in the first half of the 15th century. The new windows date from 1868.

== Interior ==
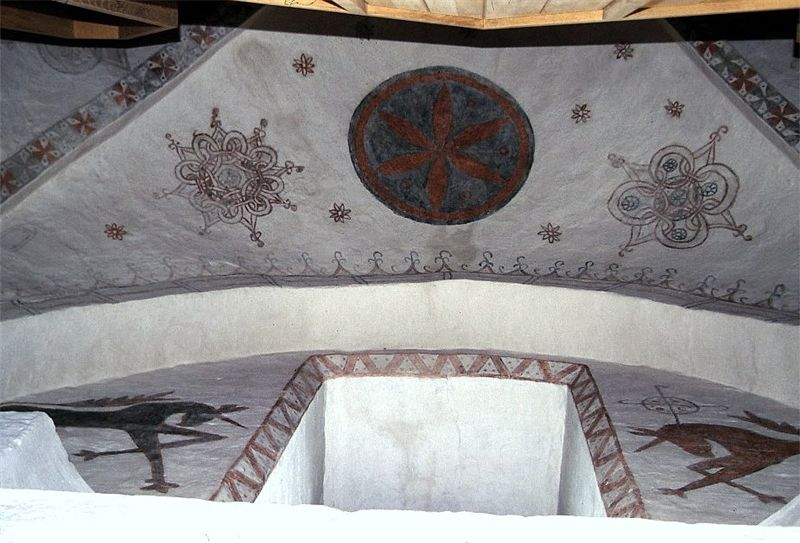
Frescos on the tower vault (c. 1520)

In 1868, frescos on the tower vault consisting of circular ornamental patterns surrounded by small rosettes were restored in black, russet and grey colouring. They are similar to those found in Stege Church on the island of Møn. Traces of similar decorations in the nave bearing the date 1522 were also found but they were not considered worthwhile preserving. There is also a wall painting of St Agnes in a niche beside the font.

The most notable item inside the church is the carved Renaissance pulpit from 1616, undoubtedly the work of the Roskilde master Anders Nielsen Hatt. It features niches with the Evangelists and their symbols. The baptismal bowl with a hart and hounds frieze is of German origin from c. 1550. The crucifix on the chancel arch bearing the outstretched figure of Christ is from the early 16th century.

== Literature ==
- Danmarks Kirker, Københavns Amt, bind 1 (PDF) (in Danish). Nationalmuseet. 1944. pp. 98–114 (Hæfte 1).
- Fang, Arthur (1972). Sct. Jørgensbjerg (in Danish). Historisk Samfund for Roskilde Amt. ISBN 9788799482832.
