= Jens Friedenreich Hage =

Danish merchant and landowner (1752–1831)

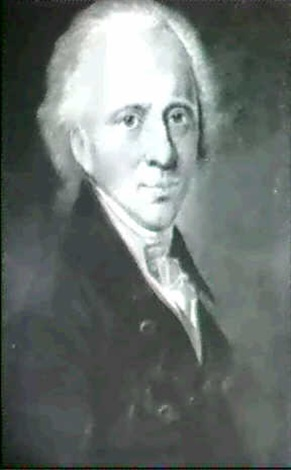
- Jens Friedenreich Hage painted by Jens Juel
- Born: 6 October 1752; Stege, Denmark
- Died: 17 June 1831 (aged 78); Copenhagen, Denmark
- Occupations: Merchant and landowner

Jens Friedenreich Hage (6 October 1752 - 17 June 1831) was a Danish merchant and landowner.

== Early life ==
Hage was born on 6 October 1752 in Stege on the island of Møn, the eldest child of Johannes Jensen Hage and Bolette Margrethe Friedenreich. The Hage family was of Dutch origins and had counted merchants at least since the 17th century. He was the elder brother of Christopher Friedenreich Hage.

== Career ==
On 11 July 1765, Hage passed his exams as a helmsman. In 1777 he moved to the Danish West Indies where he made a fortune as a merchant and plantation owner. He was the owner of the plantation Frederikshaab on St, Croix. He also purchased the Clairfield estate at Pennsylvania, In 1790, he was back in Stege. In the late 1890s, he settled as a merchant in Copenhagen. He traded under the name J. F. Hage & Co. in spite of the fact that he had no partners.

In 1800, he became chairman of Det Danske Fiskeriselskab. In 1801, he was sent on a confidential mission to the Danish West Indies with as Royal West Indian Government Commissioner (kgl. vestindisk regeringskommissær). On 2 May 1801, He was appointed to kommerceintendant with rank of justitsråd. As of 28 July 1815,

== Personal life ==
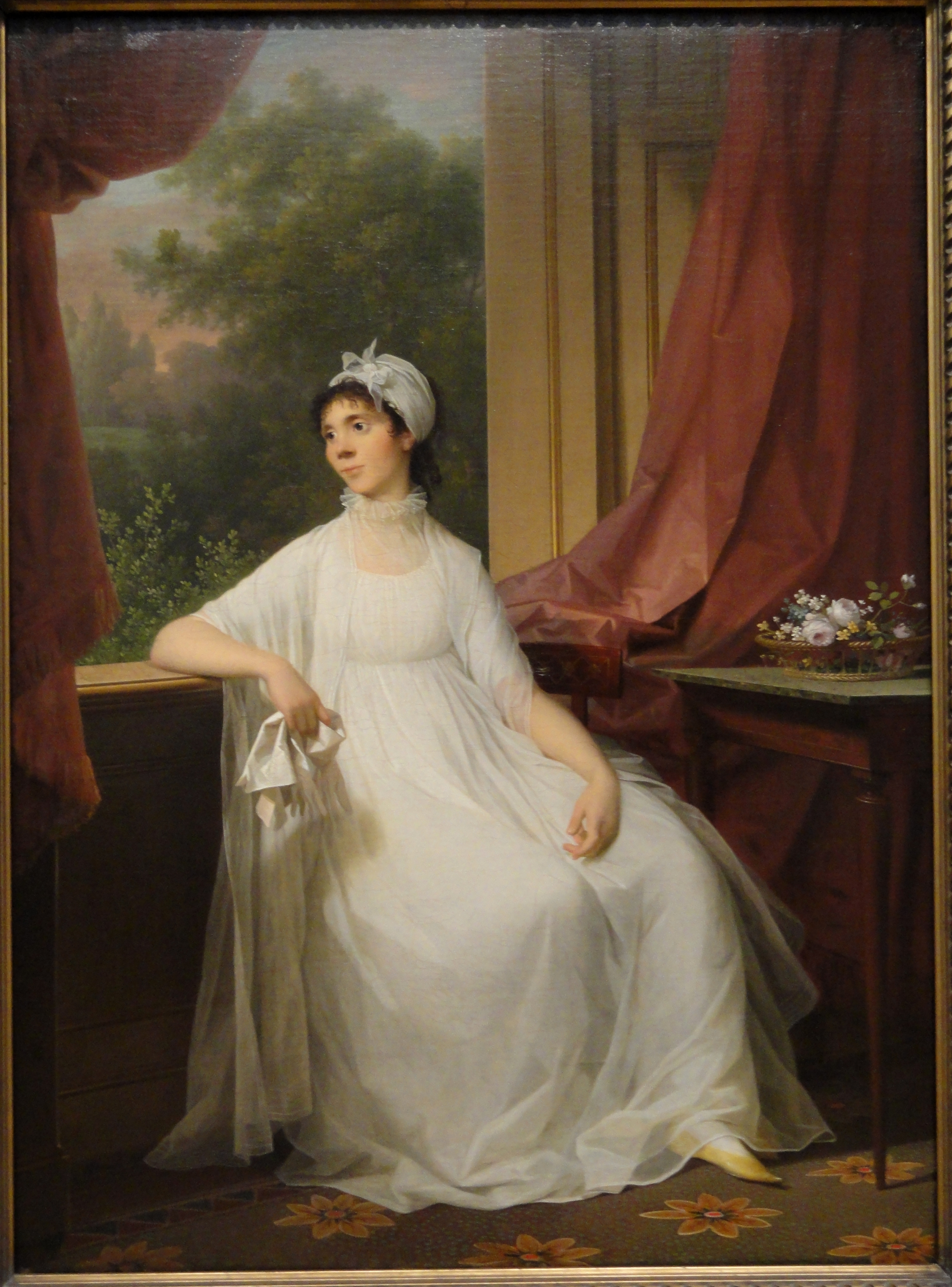
Gertrud Hage painted by Jens Juel

Hage married twice. Gis first wife was Gertrud Heitmann (1766–1801), a daughter of plantation owner in Saint Croix Fridrich Christian Heitmann (1725–1792) and Gertrud Zimmermann (1731–1787). After her death, Hage married secondly to Marie Sophie Ruspini (1783–1861), a daughter of London-based Italian surgeon and dentist Bartholomew Ruspini.

Hage died on 18 June 1831. His first wife bore him eight children of whom the following survived to adulthood and produces issue:

- Margaretha Boletha Gertrud Kipnasse (Hage) (1785–1868), was married to merchant and brewer Christian Frederik Kipnasse (1785–1829)
- Maria Catharina Julie Hage (Hage) (1787 - 1811), was married to St. Croix-based merchant Hans Henrich Jeger (1779–1812)
- Anna Sabina Henriette Hage (1789–1824), was married to St. Crpox-based merchant Tønnes Just Hänschell (1774–1829)
- Johannes Philip Hage (1796 - 1863), regiment quarter master and agricultural writer, married to Christiane Caroline Erike Sundt (1802–1857)
- Hother Hage (1800–1872), engineer in Pensulcania, married to Mary Ann Kendig (1817–1886)

he was also active as a brewer in Copenhagen. He owned a country house at Frederiksdal and Benzonseje at Køge.

One of Hage's daughter presented a portrait painting of his second wife's father to Caroline Oxholm, an unmarried daughter of former Governor of the Danish West Indies Peter Lotharius Oxholm who resided at Vallø Stift. It is now in the collection of the National Gallery of Denmark.
