= Thorsvang, Danmarks Samlermuseum =

Coordinates: 54°58′41″N 12°16′22″E

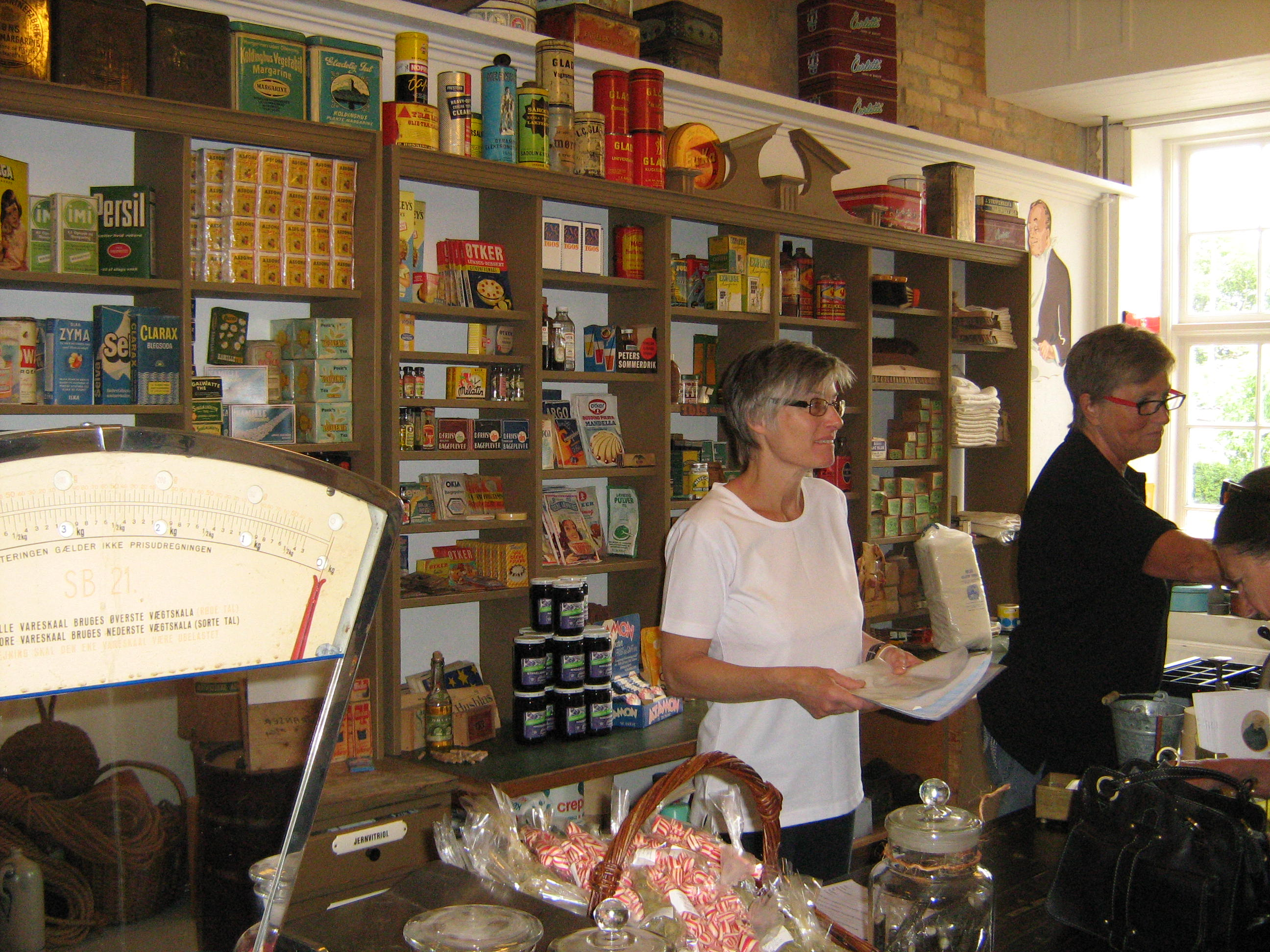
Grocer's shop, Thorsvang Samlermuseum

Thorsvang, Danmarks Samlermuseum (Thorsvang: Denmark's Museum of Collectables) is located in the Lendemarke district of Stege on the Danish island of Møn. It displays a wide variety of old items collected over the years principally by Henrik Hjortkær. They are displayed in a former powdered milk factory from 1919 which has been fitted out to represent a series of small shops typical of the early 20th century.

== History ==
The museum consists of countless items of all kinds which have been collected over the years by Henrik Hjortkær who developed an interest in collectables when he was just eight years old. Hjortkær, now in his early fifties, and his wife Bente Bille are well-known figures on Møn as they used to run Café Frederik VII on the marketplace in the centre of Stege while Hjortkær's parents and grandparents ran the restaurant in Fanefjord Skovpavillion. In his efforts to find a suitable venue for displaying his collection, Hjortkær was assisted by Møns Bank and by the tourism agency Møn-Sydsjællands Turistforening. This led to the creation of a foundation, Fonden Danmarks Samlermuseum, which succeeded in purchasing the former powdered milk factory from Vordingborg Municipality for just 1 Danish crown. In 2012, 124 volunteers — mostly pensioners — were involved in a project designed to convert the factory into a museum in the form of an old town complete with a variety of old shops in which items of various kinds could be displayed. On a typical day, some 20 elderly craftsmen could be seen laying out the old streets and building the shops. By July 2013, when the museum opened, 246 volunteers had assisted either in the work itself or in coming up with good ideas for the project.

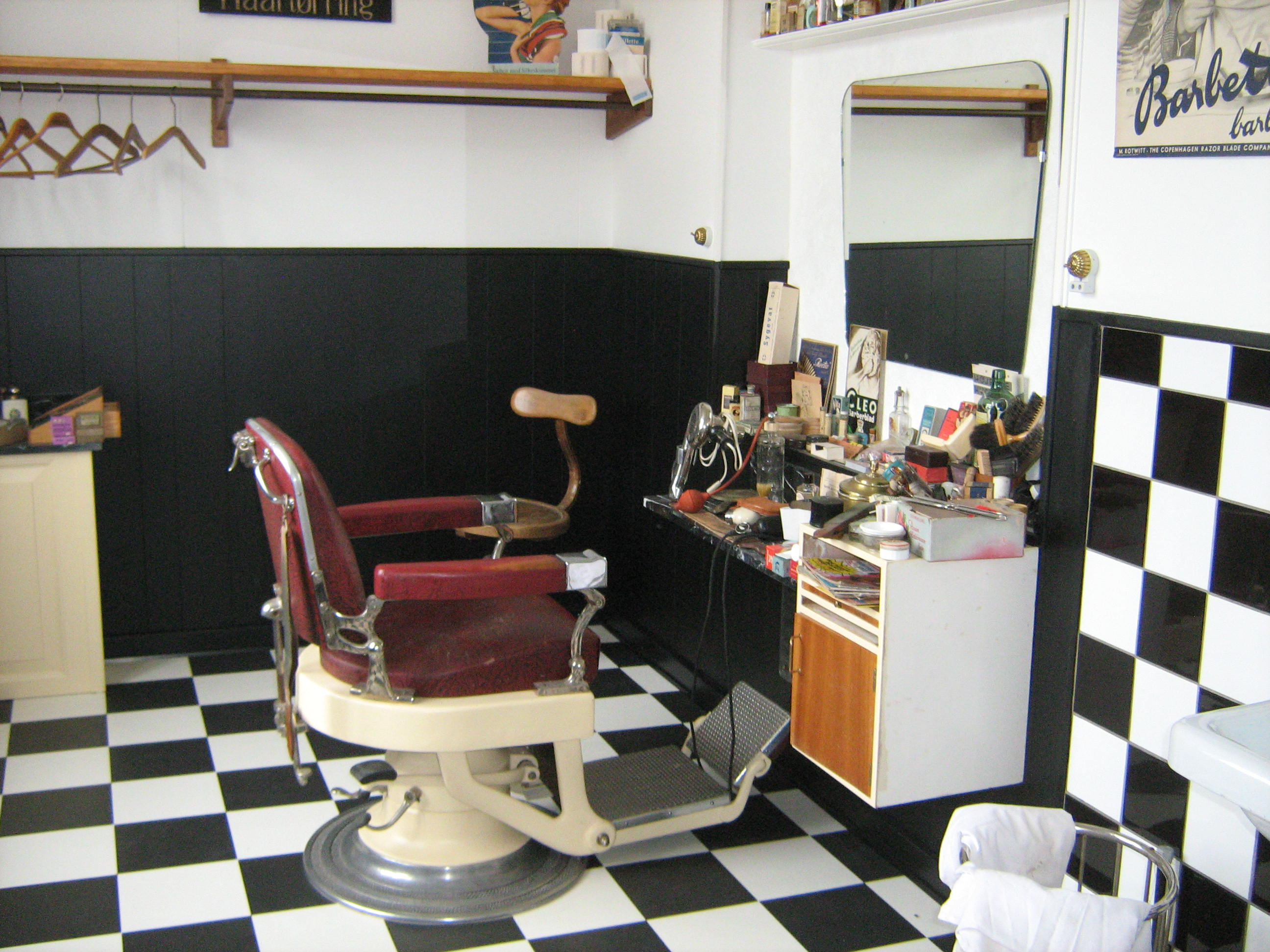
Barber's shop

== The collection ==
All the items are displayed in 18 small shops, typical of the 1920s. In addition to the grocer's which forms the entrance, there is an old bank, a locksmith, a lingerie store, a tobacco shop, a tailor's, an ice cream parlor, a butcher's, a photographer's and a post office. There is an old cigarette machine which used to deliver 10 cigarettes for 40 øre, a radio store with the second TV set ever to come to Møn and a barber's where, if you come on the right day, you can get a shave. The old classroom consists of eight small wooden desks from Vordingborg but these are soon to be replaced by desks from Møn's Sprove Skole.

== Opening hours ==
The museum is located at Thorsvang Alle 7, Stege. During the summer months, it is open every day from 10 am to 5 pm. The museum also has its own restaurant, Palmehaven.
