= Stege, Denmark =

Stege
- Town
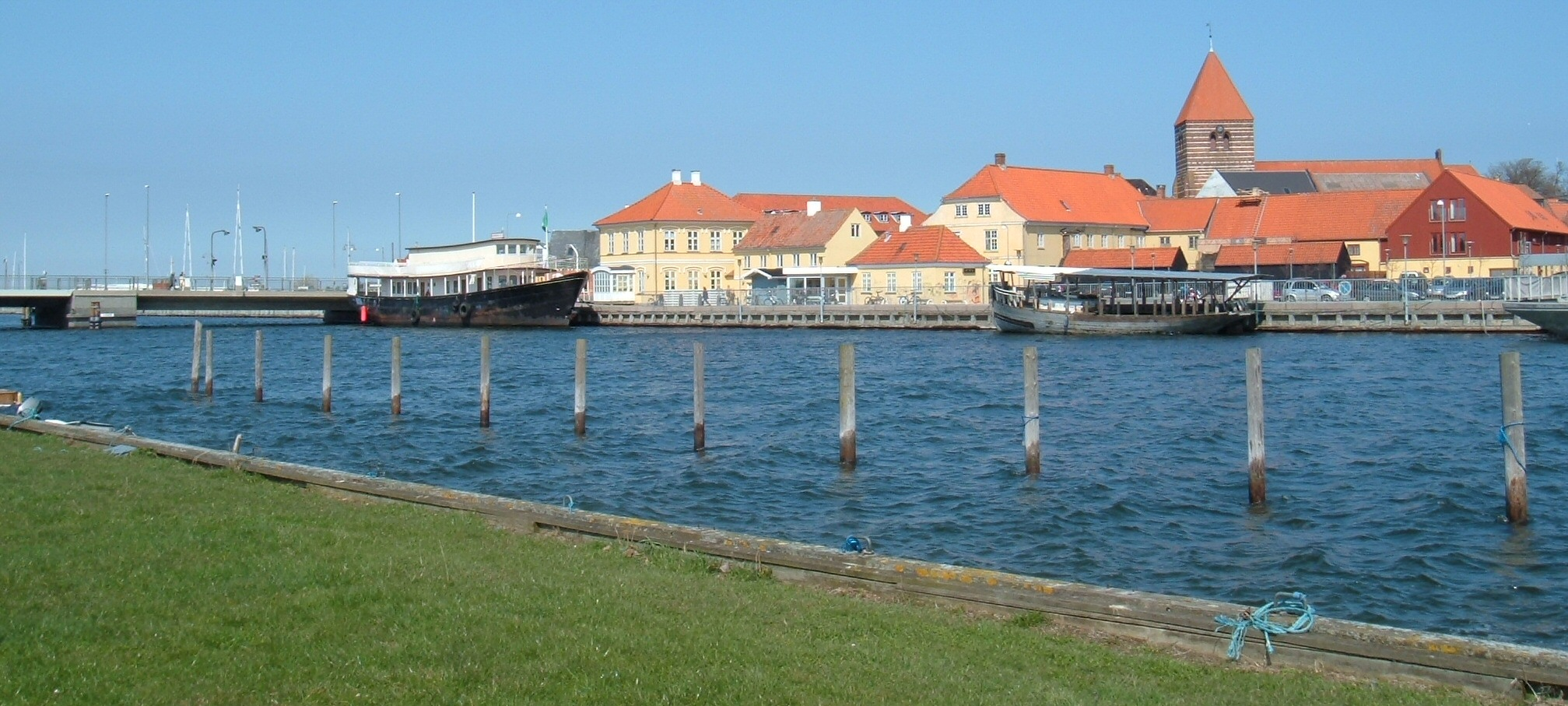
- View of Stege across Stege Nor

- Coat of arms

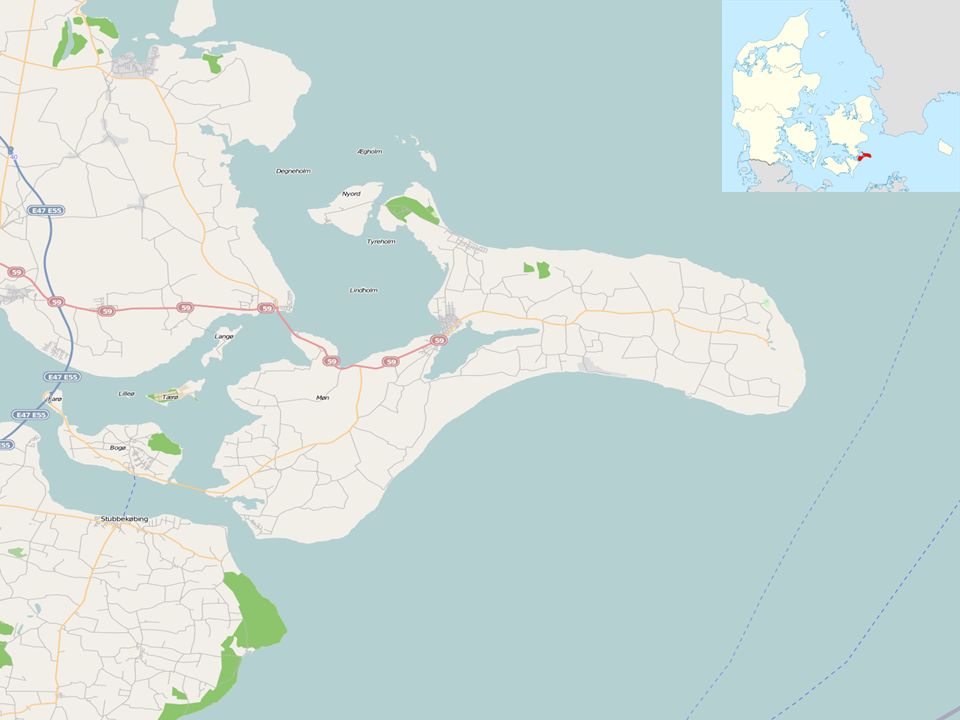
- Location on Møn Stege (Denmark Region Zealand) Stege (Denmark)
- Coordinates: 54°59′9″N 12°17′15″E
- Country: Denmark
- Region: Zealand (Sjælland)
- Municipality: Vordingborg
- Founded: 1175

Area
  - Urban: 2.7 km^{2} (1.0 sq mi)
- Elevation: 0 m (0 ft)

Population (2026)
  - Urban: 3,811
  - Urban density: 1,400/km^{2} (3,700/sq mi)
  - Municipality: 44,831
- Time zone: UTC+1 (CET)
  - Summer (DST): UTC+2 (CEST)
- Postal code: 4780

Stege is the largest town on the island of Møn in south-eastern Denmark. In January 2026, its population was 3,811. Stege is now part of Vordingborg Municipality and belongs to Region Zealand. Once a prosperous herring fishing port, tourism is now important to the local economy.

== Location ==
Stege is near the centre of the island at the mouth of Stege Nor, a lake which connects directly to the sea at the town. The mouth of the lake is now spanned by a bridge.

== Etymology ==
Stege originated as a small fishing village called Dybsbroen, on the coast just north of the eastern end of the bridge, along the street now known as Dybsbrostræde. The current name may derive from Stickae or Stike, which were wooden poles rammed into the sea inlet as a further defence against raiders.

== History ==
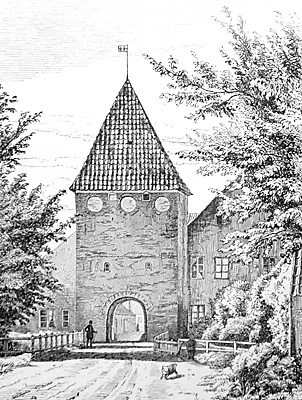
The Mølleporten town gate in the 19th century

The town received status as a merchant town in 1268 under Eric V of Denmark but there were already fortifications protecting the fishing community early in the 12th century. As the town grew, a fortress was constructed on the coast just south of the mouth of the inlet, in the 13th century. Construction costs for the town's fortress were paid for by money from the fishing of herring, the town's most important source of capital.

Around 1430, a defensive wall was constructed enclosing the landward side of the town which was otherwise bounded by the sea to the north, and the lake to the south. The wall was built on top of a rampart, with a moat so that the town was entirely surrounded by water. Three gate towers were constructed, one on each of the major roads passing through the wall. Only the Mill Gate (Mølleporten) now survives. It was converted into a prison when the remainder of the wall was demolished around 1685. What remains is one of the best preserved fortresses in the Nordic countries.

Although most of the town burnt down in 1457 and the plague struck in 1484, the prosperity which remained as a result of the herring trade soon led to its reestablishment.

The powerful Hansa state Lübeck attacked Stege in 1510 and 1522, but the town defended itself both times. In 1534, during the Count's Feud (Grevens fejde), the town could not fend off the enemy, and the fortress was destroyed. Herring fishing was also in decline, and as a result of the multiple disasters the population fell drastically. Around 1800, merchant shipping blossomed in Stege, with the deepening of the harbour, and the building of warehouses nearby. Fine merchant estates of the time can still be seen in the area. In 1883, a large sugar factory opened on the southern side of the harbour. It remained in operation until 1989.

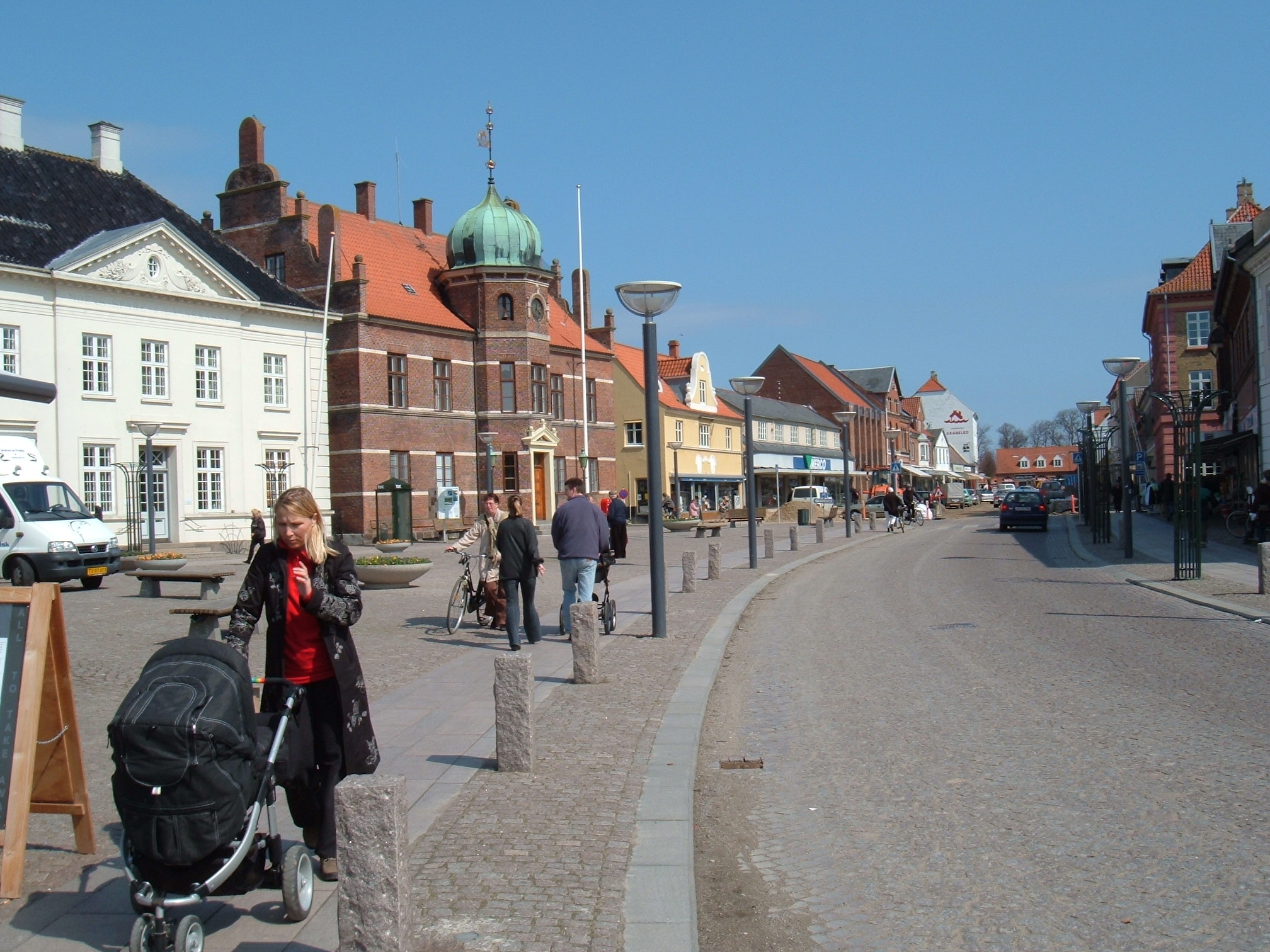
View of Main Street in Stege

== Stege in the 21st century ==
The population has not varied much in recent years, remaining around 3,800 since the 1960s. Since the sugar factory closed in 1989, the economy now relies mainly on the service sector. The town has half-timbered houses, narrow streets and many restaurants and cafes. A microbrewery, Bryghuset Møn, produces nine different beers and includes a restaurant. Thorsvang, Danmarks Samlermuseum is a museum of collectables arranged in a variety of old shops typical of the early 20th century. It is located in the Lendemarke district of Stege. The annual Stege Festival occurs every Tuesday in July and the first Tuesday in August.

Buildings of interest in Stege include:

- Stege Church, built in the Romanesque style in the early 13th century;
- Empiregården, a former merchant's residence constructed in 1813 which, since 1958, has housed Møn's Museum;
- Kammerrådgården (ca 1770), a merchant's residence by the town square;
- The pharmacy (Apoteket), a neoclassical building from around 1744, which remained in use until early 2011;
- The former town hall (1854) on the town square, designed by Michael Gottlieb Bindesbøll in the Renaissance style.
- Rødkilde Højskole, a folk high school just south of Stege completed by Ludvig Fenger in 1866.

There are regular bus services to Vordingborg, Bogø, Nykøbing Falster and to various destinations on Møn.

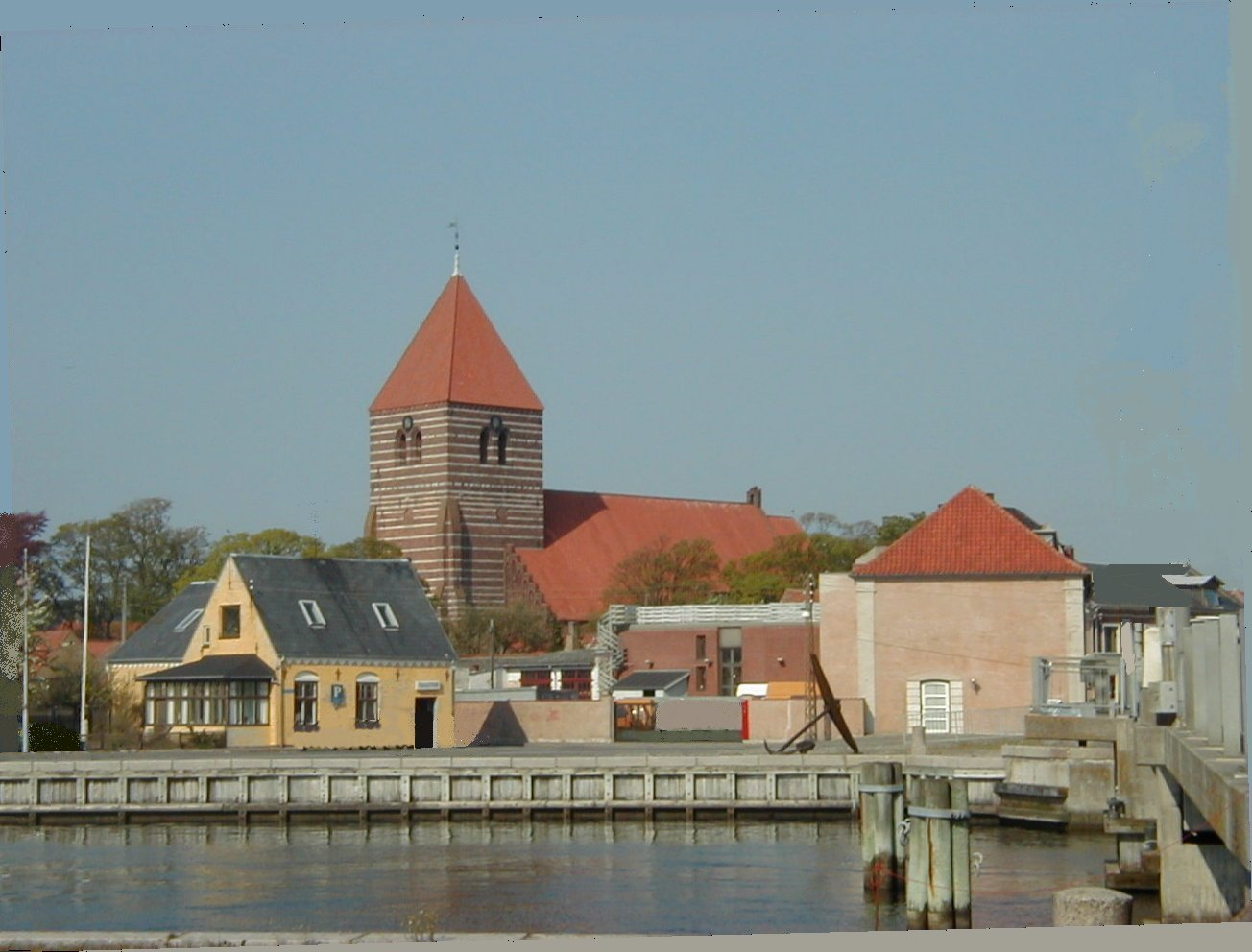
Stege Church (13th century)

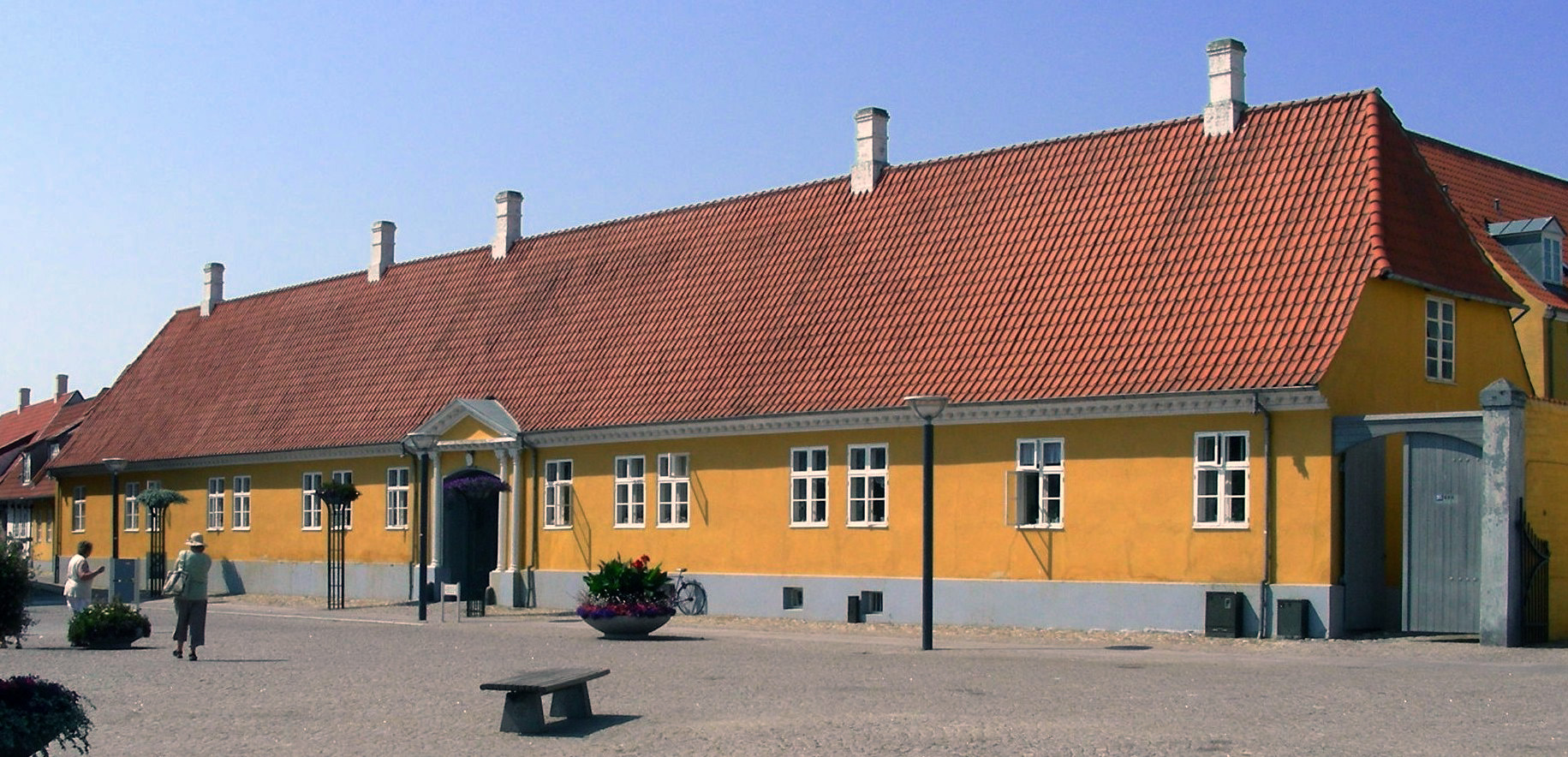
Kammerrådgården (1770)

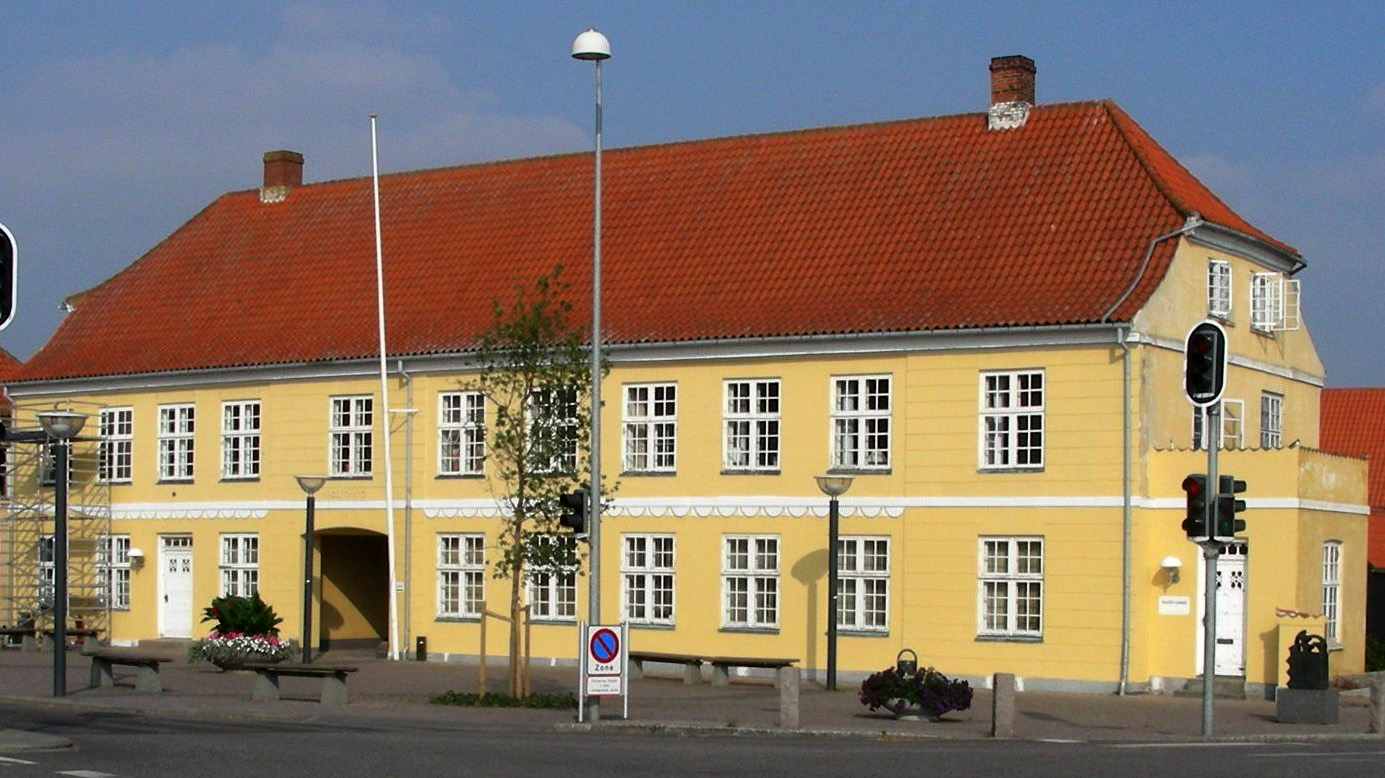
Hages Gård (1799)

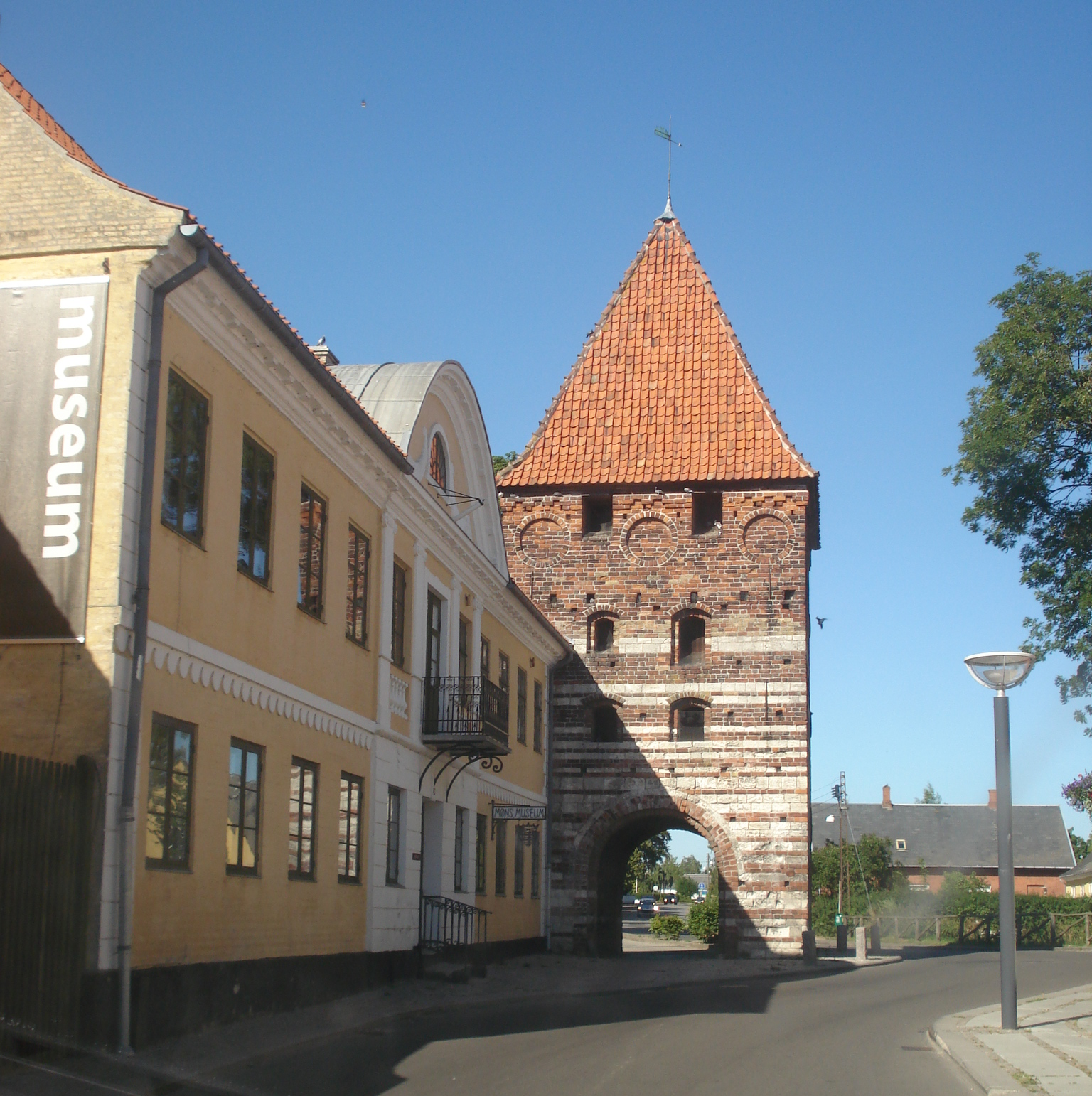
Mølleporten (1430) and Empiregården (1813)

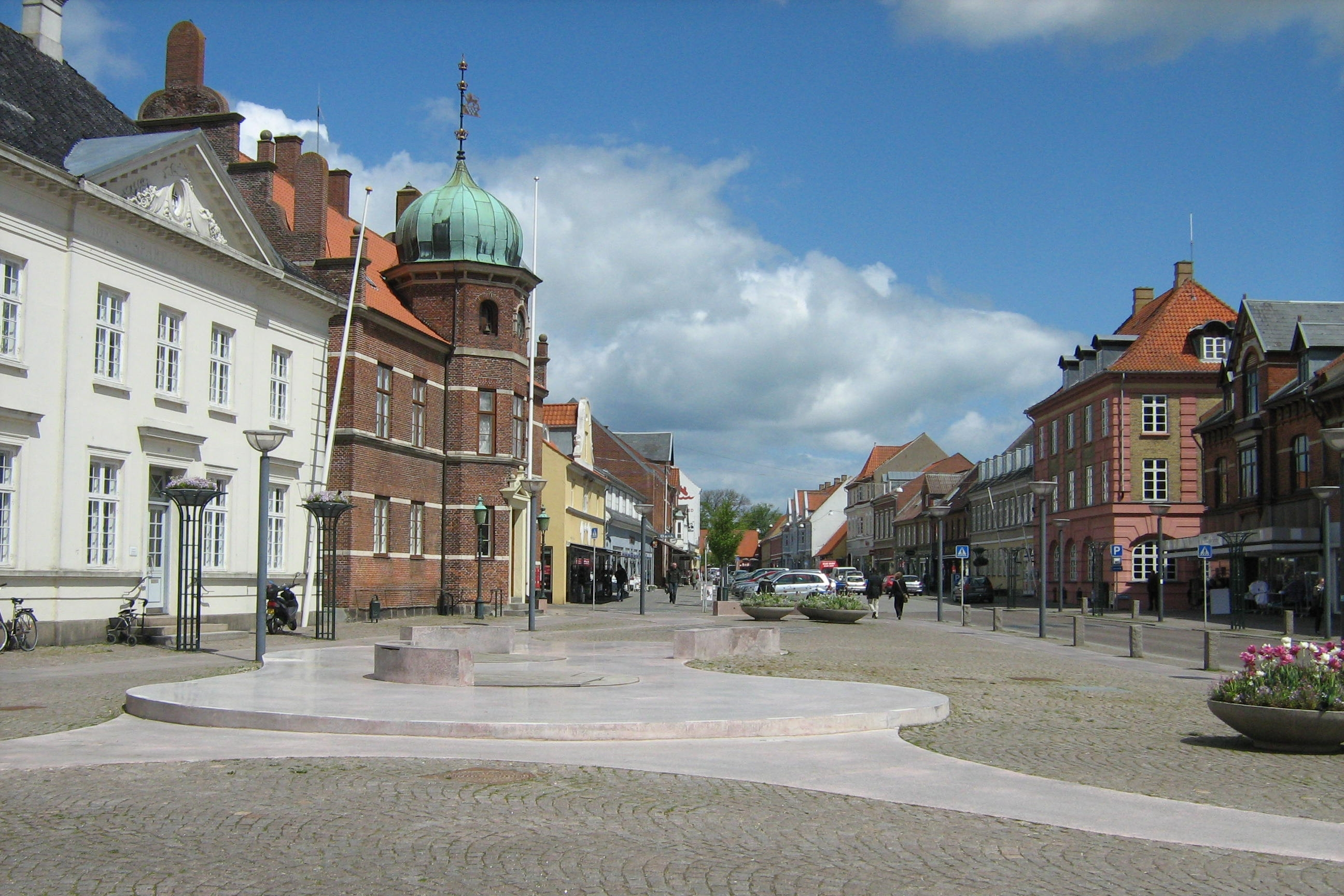
Storegade, the main street

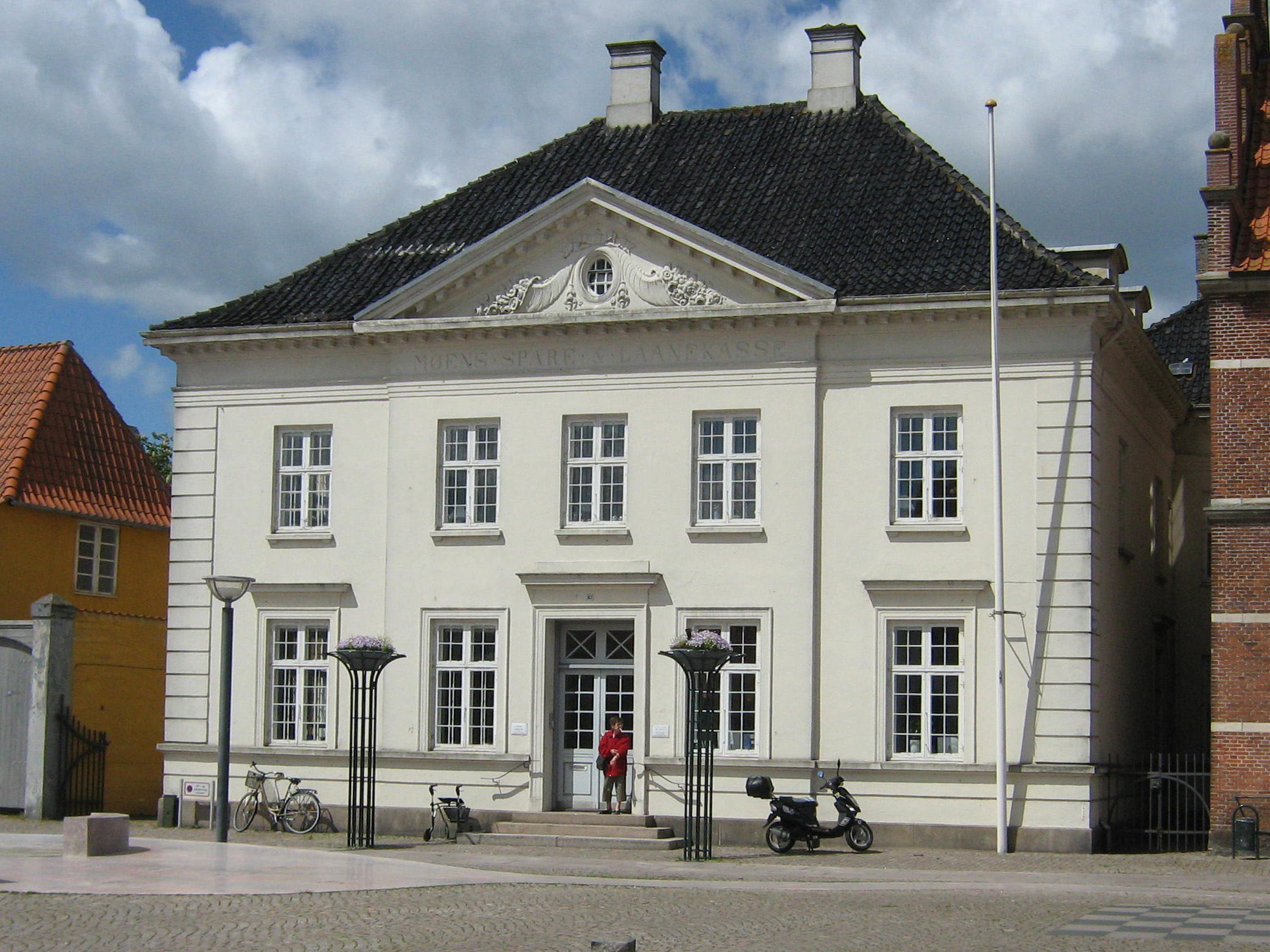
Old Sparekasse building, Stege market place

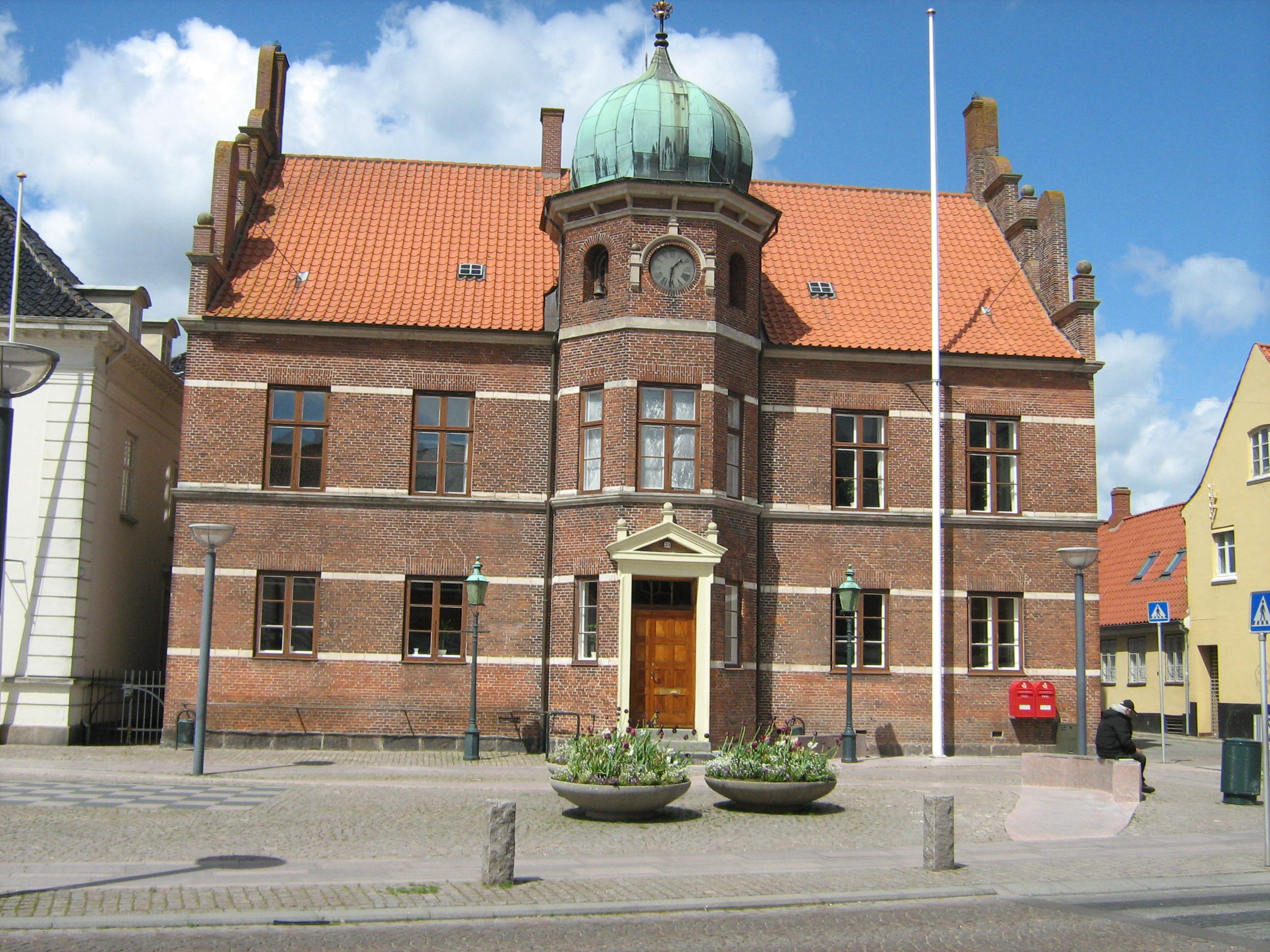
Former town hall designed by Michael Gottlieb Bindesbøll (1854)

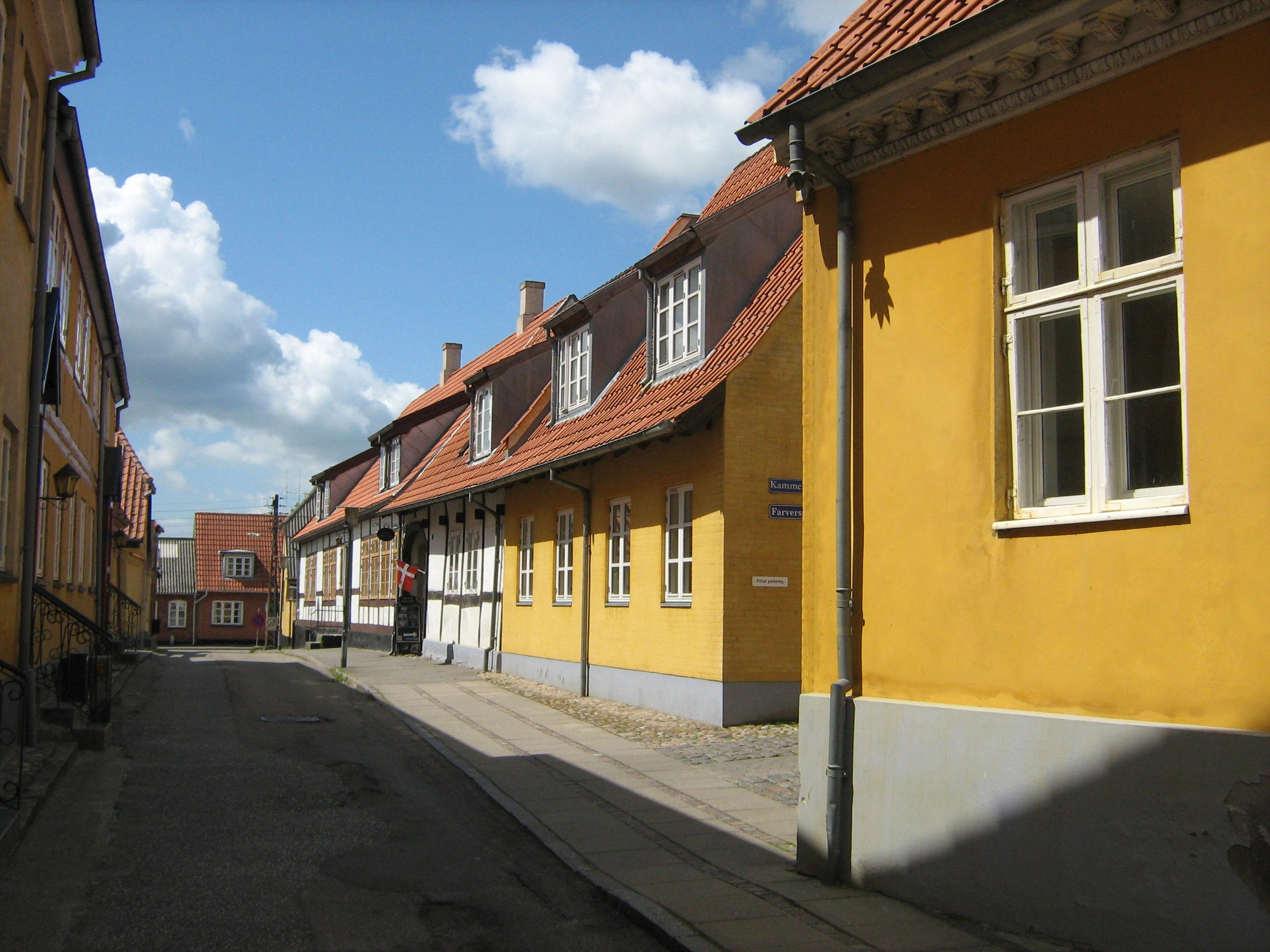
Farverstræde, one of Stege's older streets

== Famous people ==
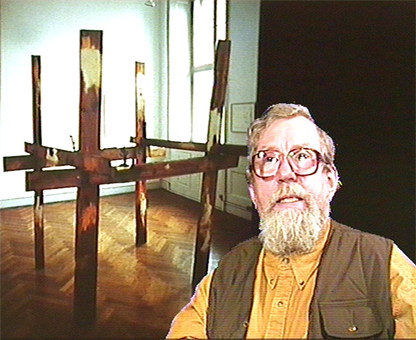
Ib Braase, 1997

- Jens Friedenreich Hage (1752 in Stege – 1831), merchant and landowner
- Christopher Friedenreich Hage (1759 in Stege – 1849), merchant
- Alfred Hage (1803 in Stege – 1872), merchant, politician, landowner and philanthropist
- Albert Gottschalk (1866 in Stege – 1906), painter
- Eva Madsen (1884–1972), municipal politician, Denmark's first female mayor when she was elected Mayor of Stege in 1950
- Inger Hanmann (1918 in Stege – 2007), artist specializing in painting and enamelwork
- Ib Braase (1923 in Stege – 2009), sculptor
- Eva Gredal (1927–1995 in Stege), politician and Member of the European Parliament (MEP)
- Marianne Grøndahl (1938 in Stege – 2012), photographer
