= Frederiks Haab, U.S. Virgin Islands =

Frederiks Haab, United States Virgin Islands
- Village
- Location within Saint Croix, U.S. Virgin Islands Location within the U.S. Virgin Islands
- Coordinates: 17.7127575°N 64.8656736°W
- Country: United States Virgin Islands
- Island: Saint Croix
- Time zone: UTC-4 (AST)

Frederiks Haab is a settlement on the island of Saint Croix in the United States Virgin Islands.

== History ==
The plantation Frederiks Haab was for a while owned by Jens Friedenreich Hage.
