= Tuse =

- Village
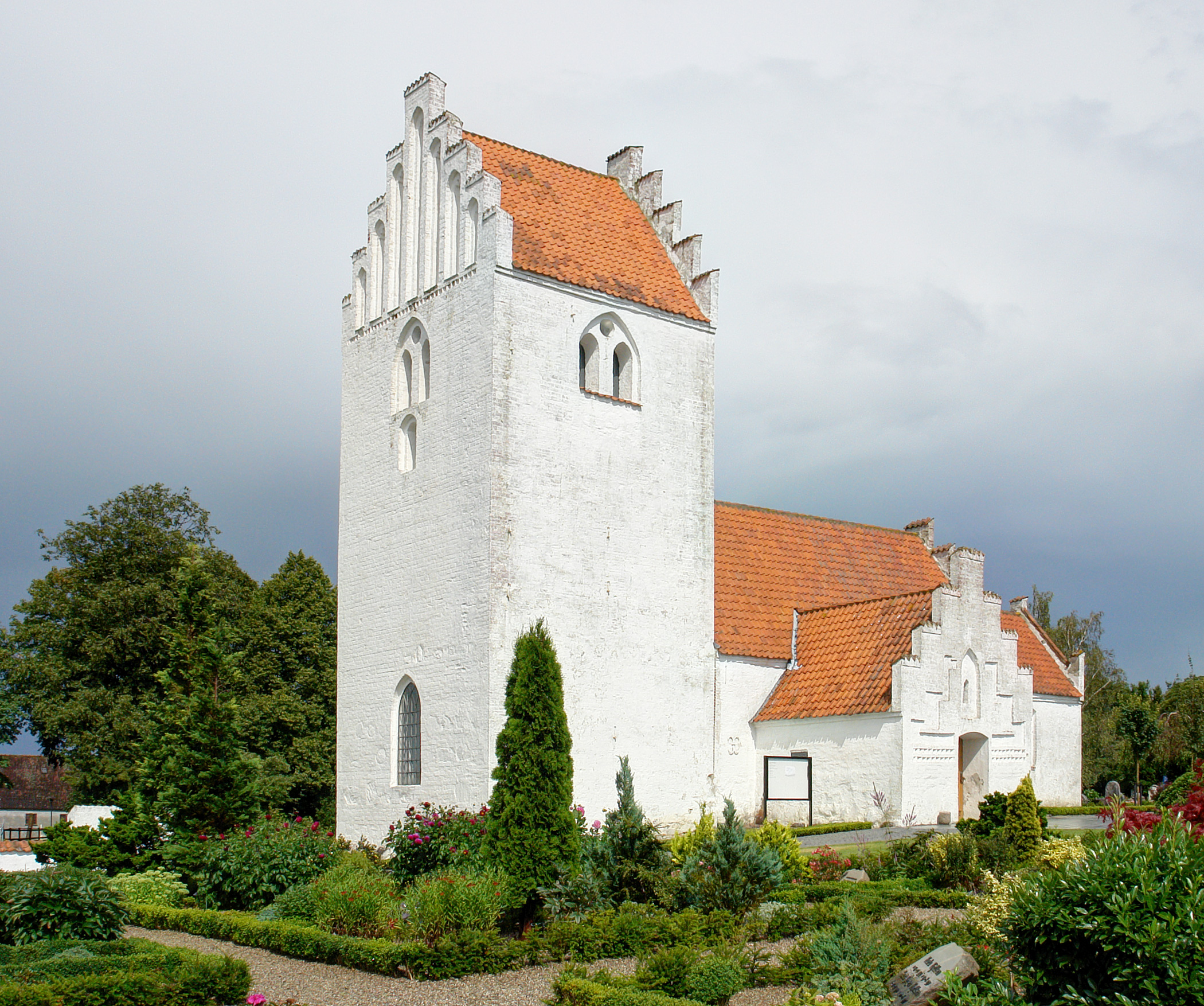
- Tuse Church

- Location in Denmark Tuse (Denmark Region Zealand)
- Coordinates: 55°42′42″N 11°37′31″E
- Country: Denmark
- Region: Zealand
- Municipality: Holbæk

Area
  - Total: 0.7 km^{2} (0.27 sq mi)

Population (1. January 2026)
  - Total: 1,387
  - Density: 2,000/km^{2} (5,100/sq mi)
- Time zone: UTC+1 (CET)
  - Summer (DST): UTC+1 (CEST)
- Postal code: 4300
- Area code: (+45) 59
- Website: tuse.holbaek.dk

Tuse is a village in Denmark, located about 5 km (3.1 mi) west of Holbæk. It has a population of 1,387 (1 January 2026). Tuse is located in Holbæk Municipality and therefore is part of the Zealand Region.

The town has a relatively large local historical significance, as it controlled trade between Holbæk Fjord and the area further up from the stream of Tuse Å in ancient times. The town has thus given its name to the late Tuse Herred and Tuse Næs.

== Notable people ==
- Frederik Tingager (born 1993), Danish professional footballer
- Morten Frendrup (born 2001), Danish professional footballer
