= Charlotte Hanmann =

Danish photographer, painter and graphic artist

- Born: 20 July 1950 (age 74); Copenhagen, Denmark
- Occupation(s): Photography, painting and graphic art
- Years active: 1979–present

Charlotte Hanmann (born 20 July 1950) is a Danish photographer, painter and graphic artist, capturing the urban environment with processed photographs.

== Biography ==
Charlotte Hanmann was born on 20 July 1950 in Copenhagen. Her parents were Poul Frederik Hanmann, a painter, and Inger Hanmann who attained fame with her enamel art work, on display for example in Copenhagen Airport and at the former Landesbank. In 1973 she studied initially at the School of Architecture and obtained a degree in civil engineering. As her interest was in art, she continued her studies at the School of Applied Arts and received a degree in art in 1985. She also trained at AKAD college in 1988 and continued with courses in the fields of stamping, screen printing, and lithography. She honed her technique in mixed media and in new techniques such as transposition of photographs over sandblasted woodcuts at the University of Alaska Fairbanks during 1994. She also benefited from training under a grant from the Danish Arts Foundation during 2002. She has held exhibitions at: Filosofgangen, Odense in 2009; Lyngby Kunstforening, Copenhagen in 2010; at Stege Bibliotek, Bispegarden Kalundborg, Pakhuset, and Nykøbing Sjælland in 2011; at the Norske Kirke, Copenhagen, in 2012, 2013 and 2014.

As a professional photographer, her works have been exhibited in group exhibitions in the House of the Holy Ghost, Copenhagen, Odense's Art Gallery Filosoffen and in Silkeborg. In 2010 and 2015, the Lyngby Cultural Society (Lyngby Kunstforening) presented her works in solo exhibitions.

== Exhibitions ==
Hanmann has exhibited her art work at a large number of exhibitions such as in:

- 1982: Copenhagen Municipality
- 1983: Artists' Summer Exhibition, Tistrup
- 1984 Svendborg Art Association; and Artists Summer Exhibition, Tistrup
- 1985 Svendborg Art Association; Artists Summer Exhibition, Tistrup; West Zealand juried art exhibition; and photographers juried art exhibition in Billund
- 1986: Artists' Easter Exhibition, Aarhus; photographers juried art exhibition, Billund; Autumn Art Exhibition Den Frie, Copenhagen
- 1987 Autumn Art Exhibition Den Frie, Copenhagen.
- 1988: 2nd International Triennale der Kunst, Lublin, Poland; Workers Museum Copenhagen, 88 photos.
- 1991: Female Artists in Nikolaj Church, Gothenburg, Sweden, 41 photos; 3rd Triennale der Kunst, Lublin; Solo exhibition of graphics and drawings at Muzeum na Majdanku Poland
- 1992:International Miniature Art Biennial Quebec, Canada; Charlottenborg Spring Exhibition
- 1993: Gallery Marius Summer Exhibition; Solo exhibition of graphics, paintings and photos at Nådada, Copenhagen
- 1994: Solo exhibition at Gallery Site 250, Alaska, US; Quebec International Miniature Art Biennial; the Museum IV International Triennale der Kunst at Lublin, Poland of the Polish Ministry of Culture where she received the medal and prize for her photos and was the sole representative from Denmark
- 1995: 44 graphic works at Nordnorsk Kunstnersenter in Svolvær Lofoten, Norway, then as a traveling exhibition in Northern Norway
- 1996: Exhibition at Danske Bank's headquarters in Copenhagen.
- 1998: Exhibition of graphics at the American Embassy; 107 works of graphics and photos exhibited at Cobra's Sophienholm
- 2000: Exhibition of graphics at Gallerie Zenit's Christmas show; and Nude drawing exhibition, Gallopperiet, Christiania
- 2001:Christmas exhibition of art on paper, Slovenia
- 2002: Group exhibition in the Salle d'exposition de la Cité internationale des arts, Paris
- 2003: Oksnehallen, Copenhagen: sculpture
