= Anders Nielsen Hatt =

Danish wood carver

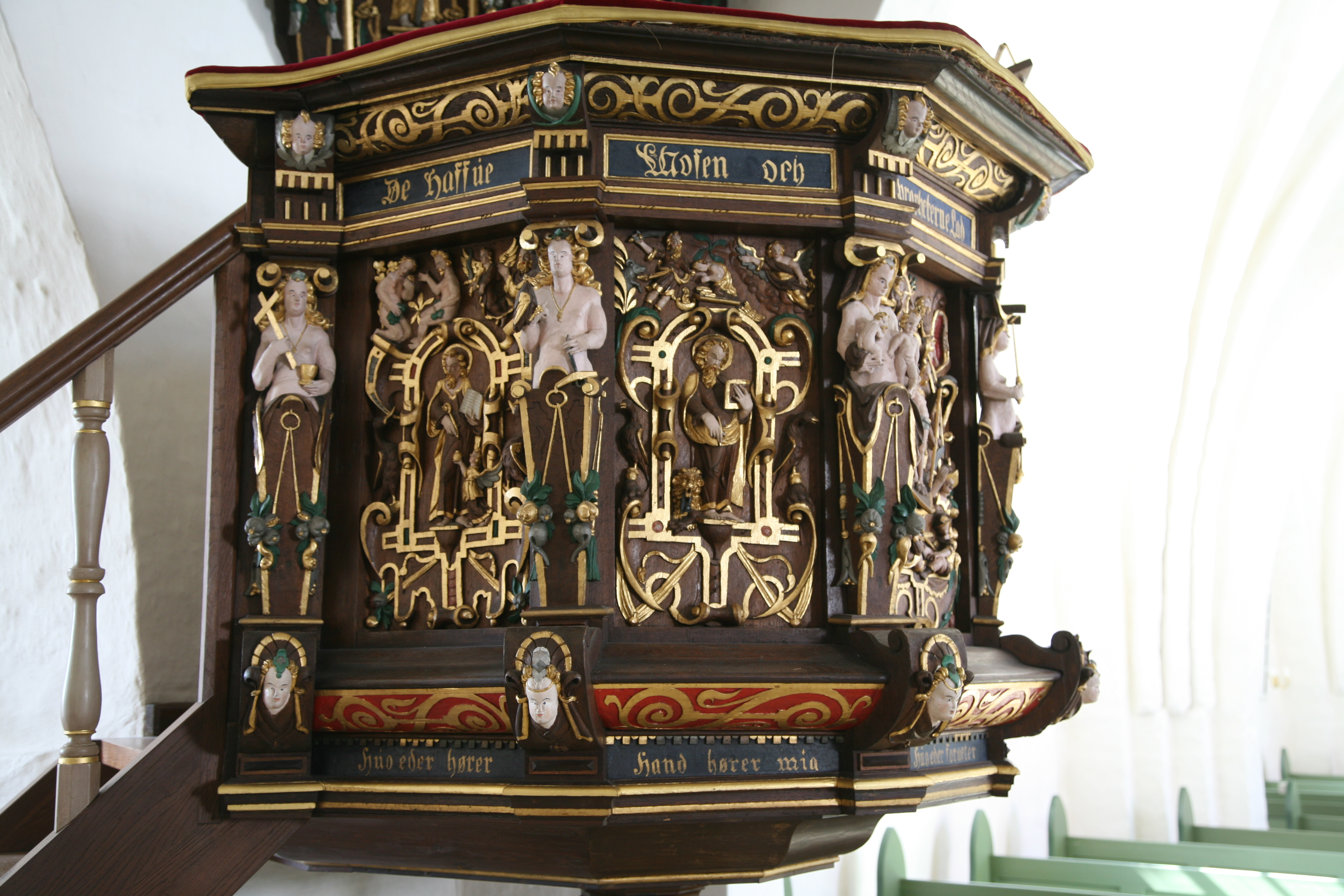
Pulpit, Fyrendal Church (1616), attributed to Anders Nielsen Hatt

Anders Nielsen Hatt (born before 1612, died after 1626) was a wood carver active in Roskilde on the Danish island of Zealand. He is remembered especially for his carved pulpits in the area.

There is only one remaining work signed by Nielsen Hatt, the pulpit in Stenløse Church near Frederikssund. The accounts for the church in Ubby Church near Kalundborg indicate that a craftsman from Roskilde created the pulpit there. It was very probably Nielsen Hatt, especially as it coincides with his style. The pulpit in Smørum Church is said to be the work of Brix Michgell's workshop in Roskilde but the figures of the Evangelists are certainly Nielsen Hatt's. The altarpiece in Tuse Church is said to be his work and he is thought to have contributed to the altarpiece in Smørum.

The pulpit in St Jørgensbjerg Church in Roskilde is also thought to be the work of Nielsen Hatt, as is the pulpit in Svinninge Church.

== Gallery ==
The works illustrated below are also attributed to Nielsen Hatt:

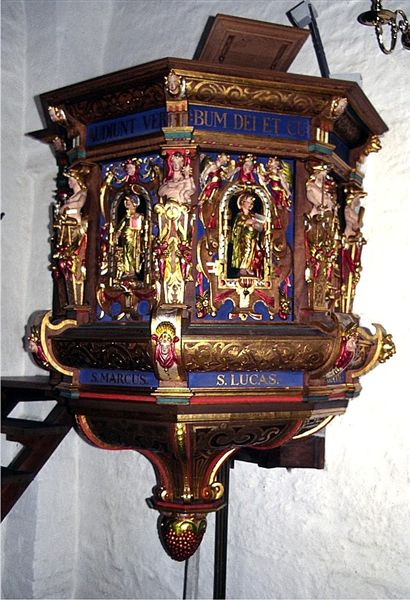
Pulpit, Smørum Church (1609)

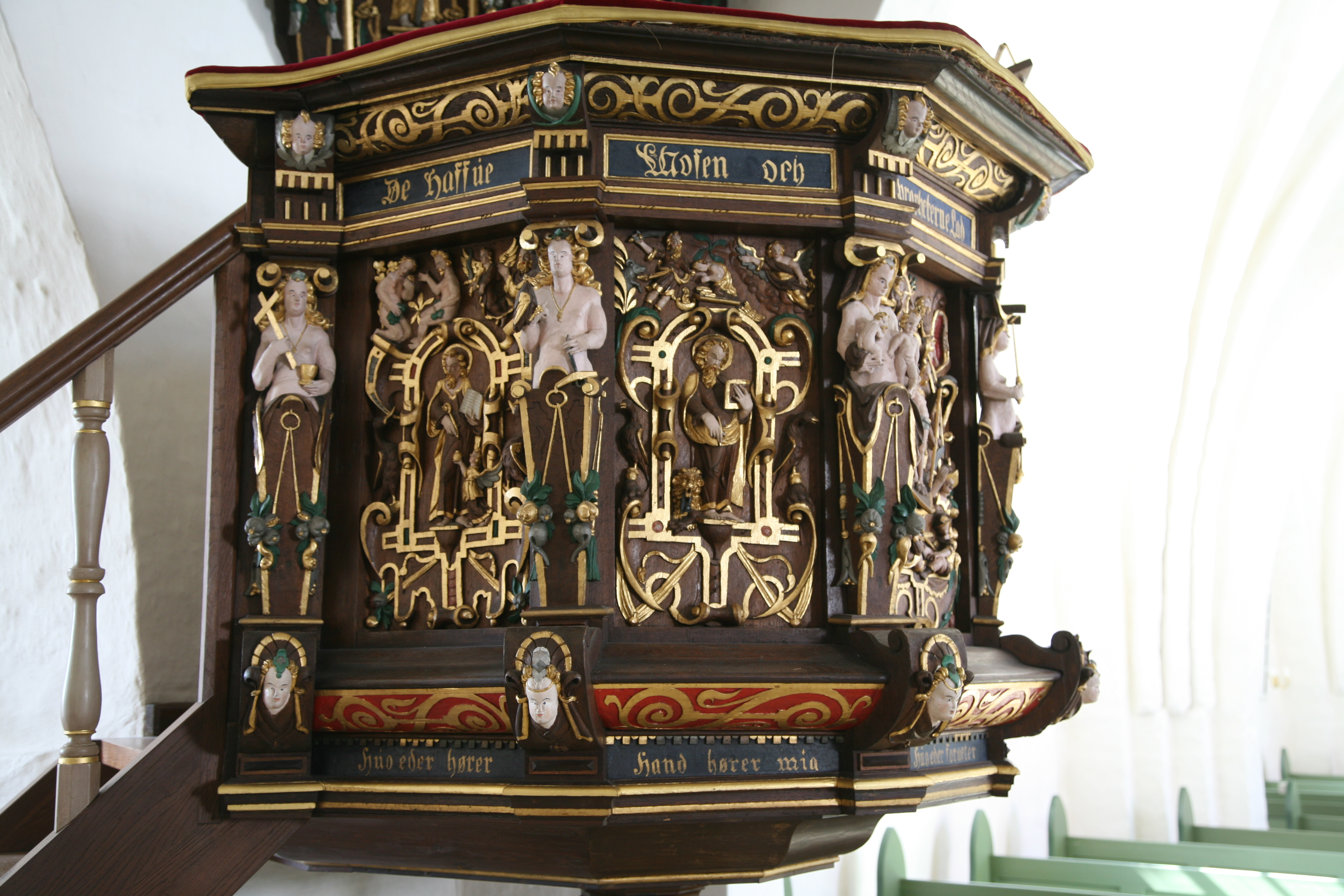
Pulpit, Fyrendal Church (1616)

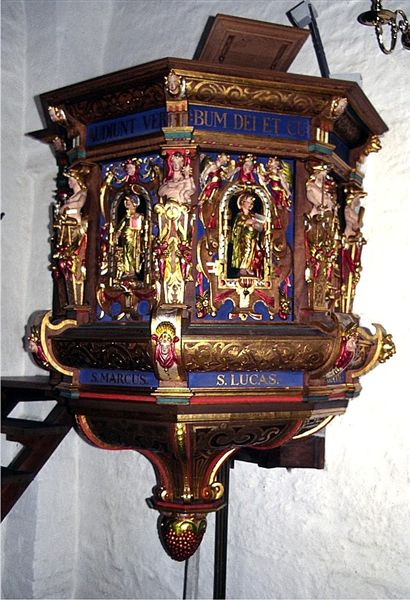
Pulpit, St Jørgensbjerg Church (1616)

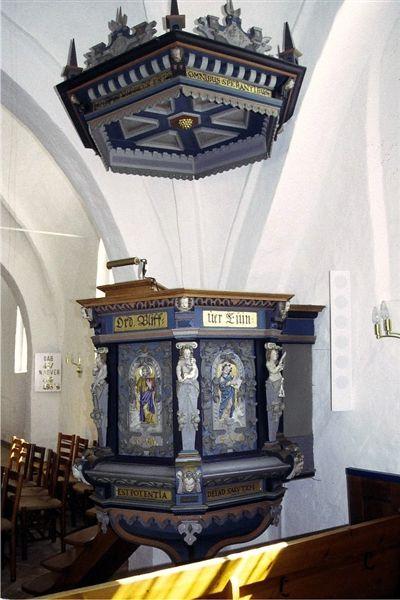
Pulpit, Svinninge Church (1619)

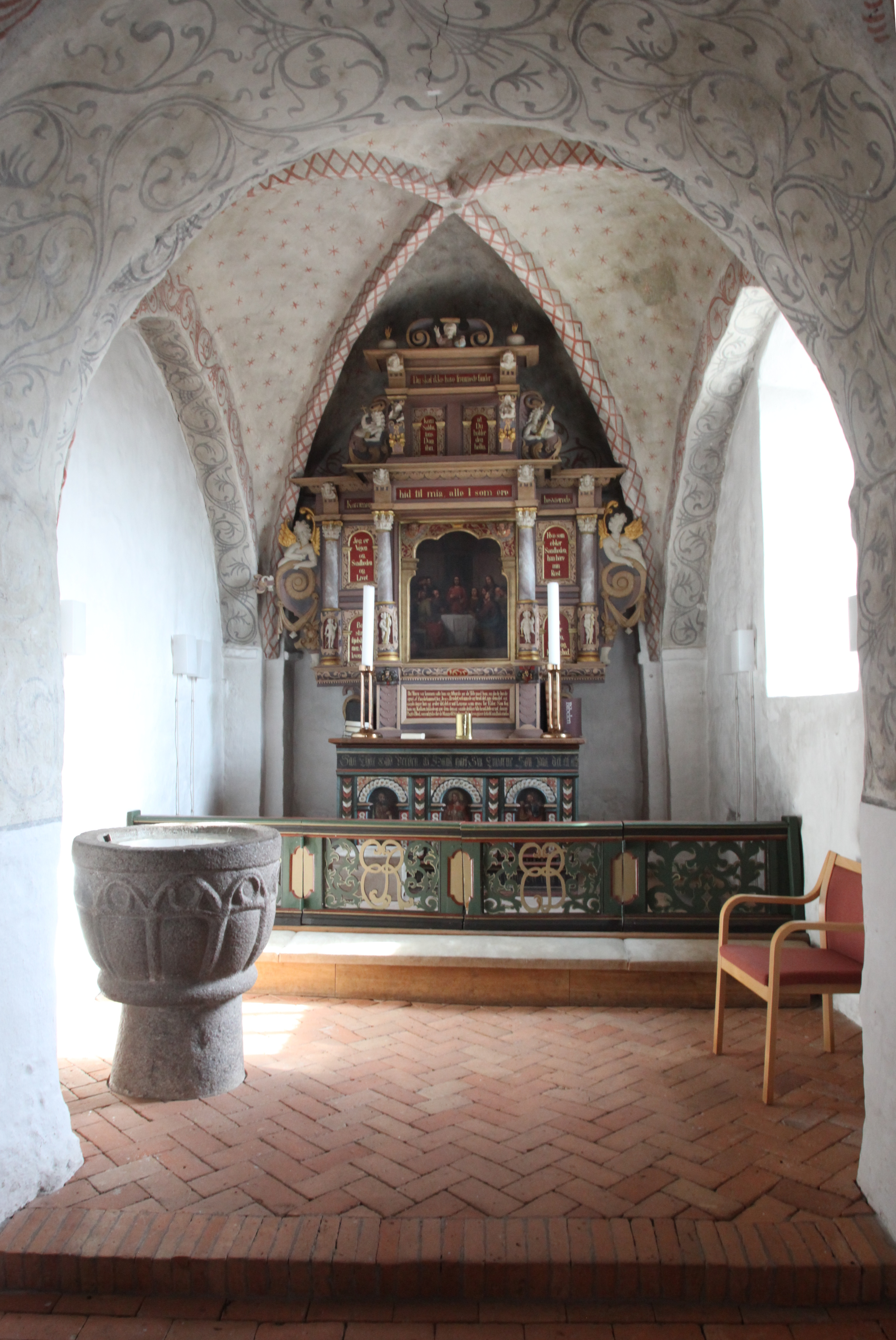
Altarpiece, Tuse Church (1625)

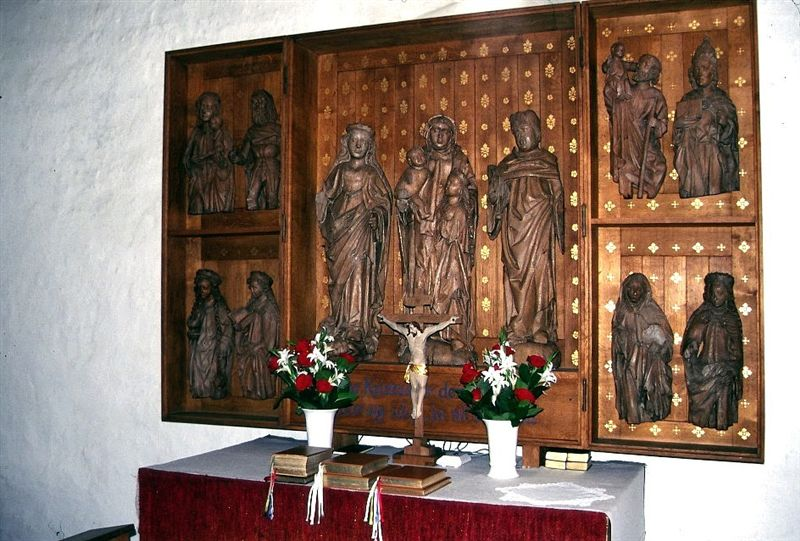
Figures, St Jørgensbjerg

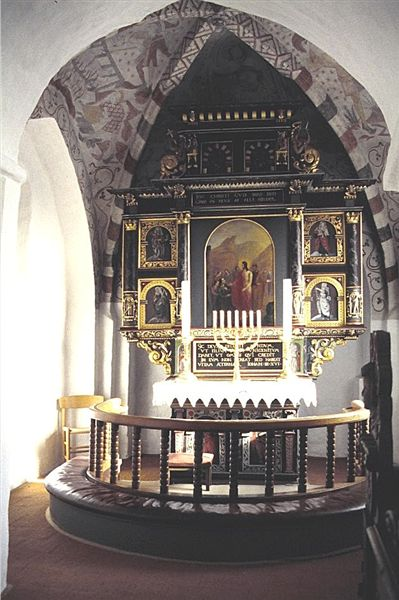
Altarpiece, Sønder Asmindrup Church (1624)
