= Tuse Church =

Coordinates: 55°42′56″N 11°36′58″E

- Tuse Kirke
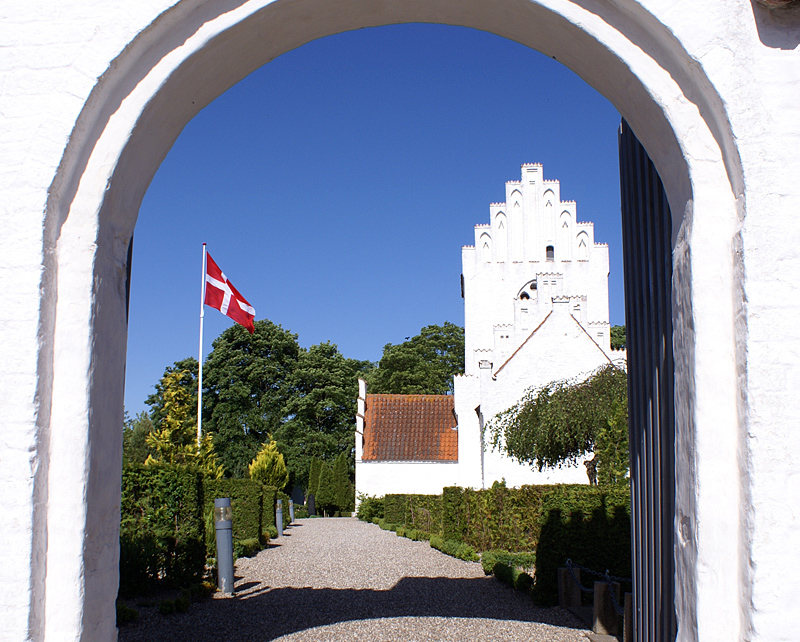
- Tuse Church
- Location: Tuse, Zealand
- Country: Denmark
- Denomination: Church of Denmark

Architecture
- Completed: 1200

Administration
- Diocese: Diocese of Roskilde
- Deanery: Holbæk Provsti
- Parish: Butterup-Tuse Sogn

Tuse Church is located near Holbæk in northwestern Sealand, Denmark. It dates back to the year 1200.

== Frescos ==
The church is richly decorated with both romanesque and late gothic murals. It is however the latter which are regarded as possibly the finest works of the Isefjord artists who were most active from 1460 to 1480. The pictures depict stories from the Old and New Testaments but the life of Jesus is particularly interesting as it combines the biblical accounts with images of kings, devils and women brewing beer.

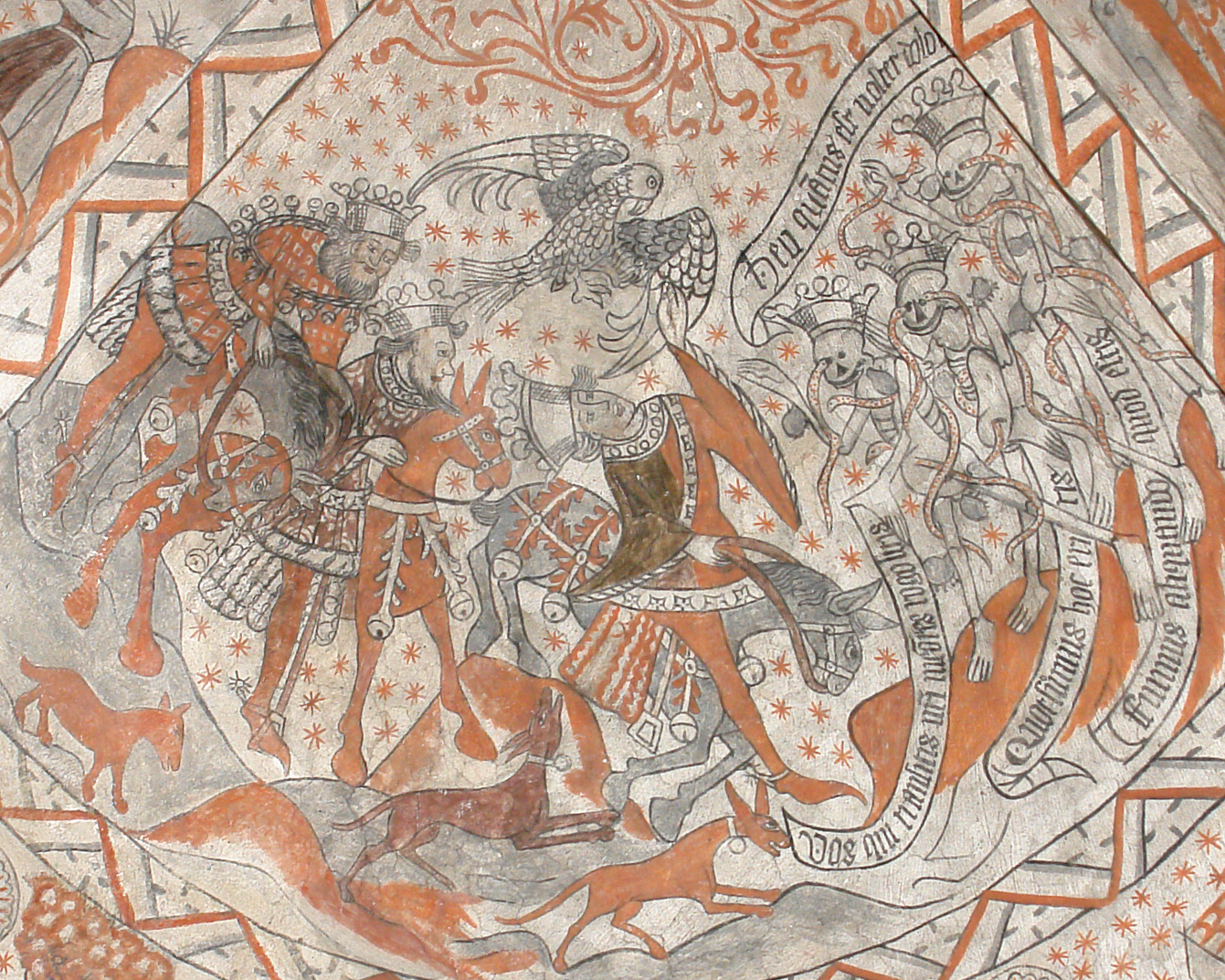

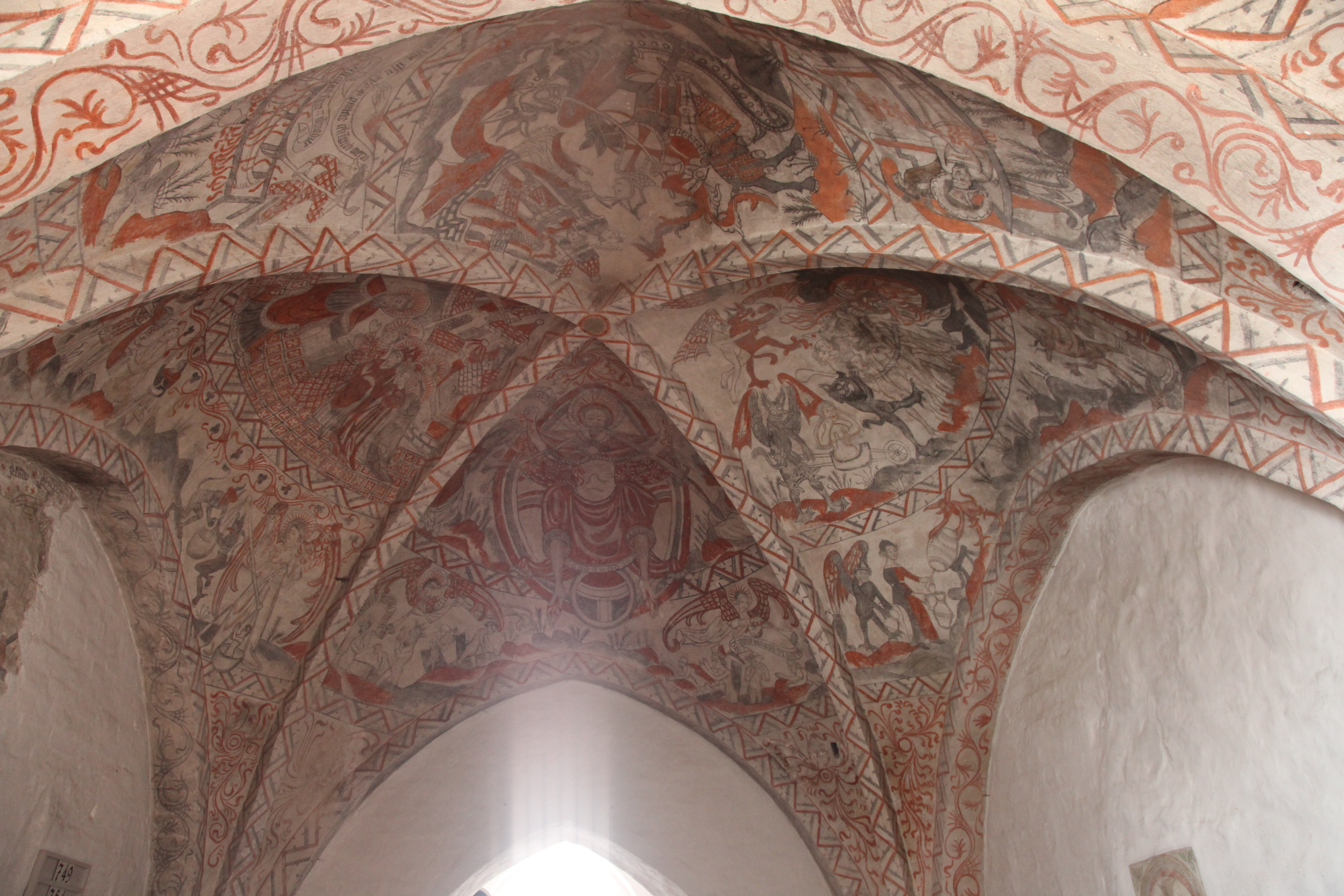

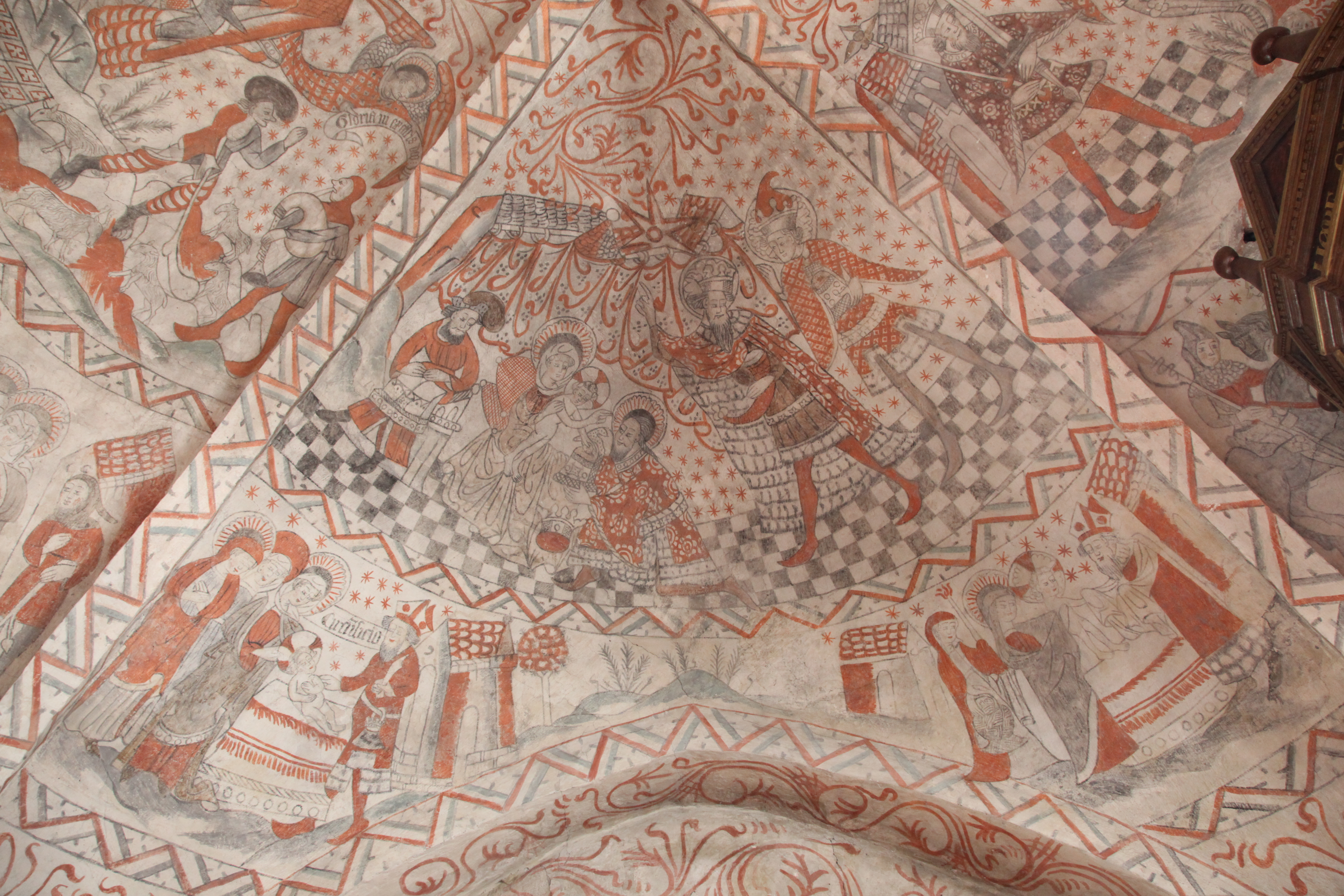

== Furnishings ==
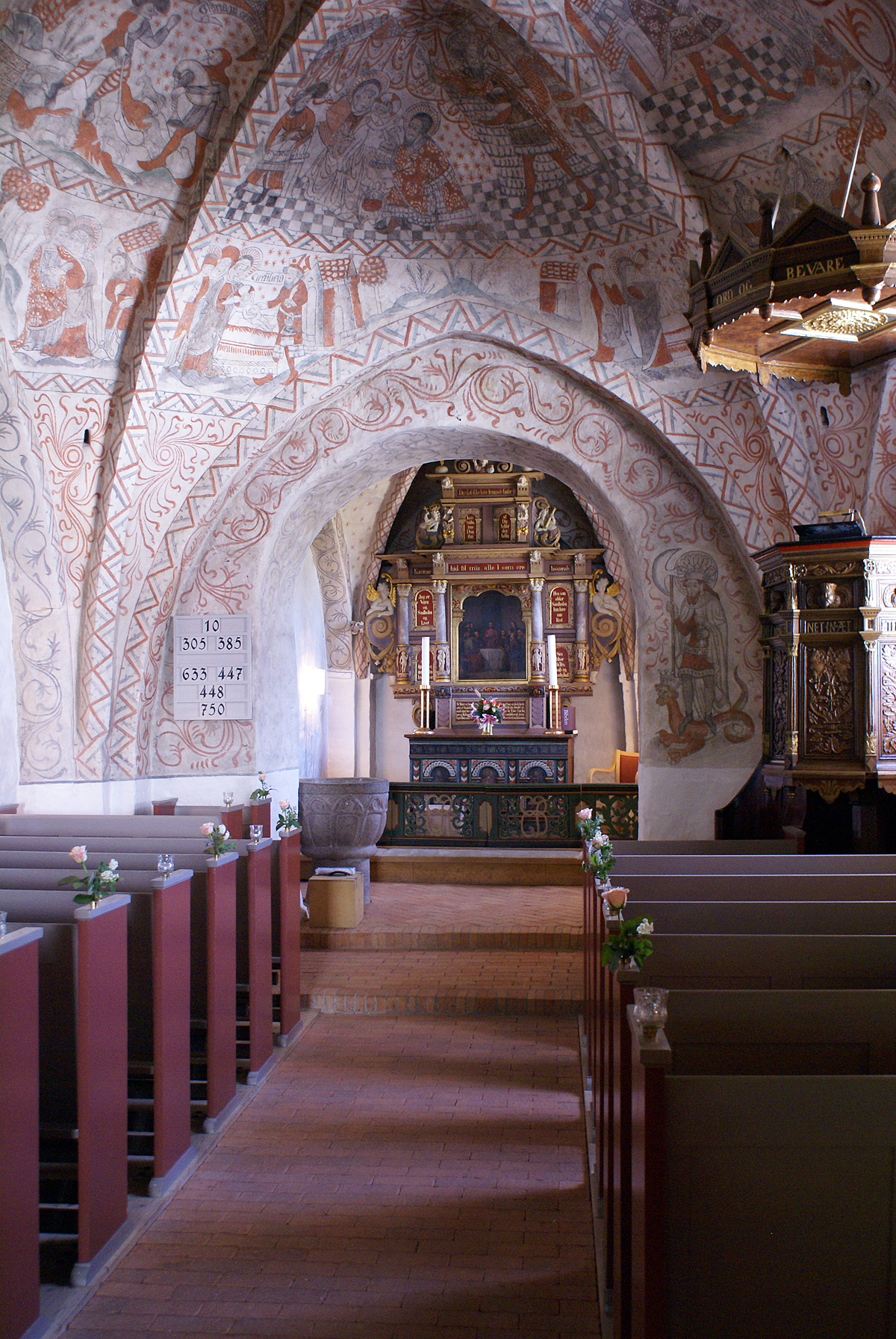
Frescos above the altar

The painting above the altar from 1625 shows the Last Supper while the 1600 altarpiece by Anders Nielsen Hatt has carvings of Christ flanked by two apostles. The pulpit is from 1584.

== Churchyard ==
Notable burials in the churchyard include:

- Gunnar Olsen, writer, historian and archivist
- Karen Marie Olsen (1921-1977), writer and archivist

== See also ==
- Church frescos in Denmark
