= Bryghuset Møn =

Brewery in Stege, Denmark

Bryghuset Møn is a micro-brewery in the town of Stege on the Danish island of Møn. Bryghuset Møn is also a restaurant and café. It opened in 2005 in a historic trading establishment, its master brewer being Svend Austel of Bamberg, Germany. The brewery produces nine different kinds of beer.

In December 2012, the establishment was acquired by David Jensin, a chef, and Thomas Stecher who already run Café Sommerspiret at GeoCenter Møns Klint.
