= Brix Michgell =

Carpenter and wood carver

Brix Michgell, also Brix Michael (born before 1612, died after 1627), was a carpenter and wood carver who was active in Roskilde on the Danish island of Zealand. He is remembered for his intricately carved pulpits and altarpieces in the area.

== Life ==
Michgell, who had probably immigrated from the north of Germany, was registered as a master carpenter in Roskilde in 1612 but he had already completed work on a cupboard and a chest. In 1609, he had also created the pulpit in Smørum Church, apparently with the assistance of Anders Nielsen Hatt. He went on to produce at least 13 pulpits and six altarpieces. His most prized work is a cupboard in the National Museum. He worked in the German Renaissance style as practised in the Copenhagen area by Statius Otto from Lüneburg.
