= The Workers Museum =

Coordinates: 55°41′5.4″N 12°34′12.9″E

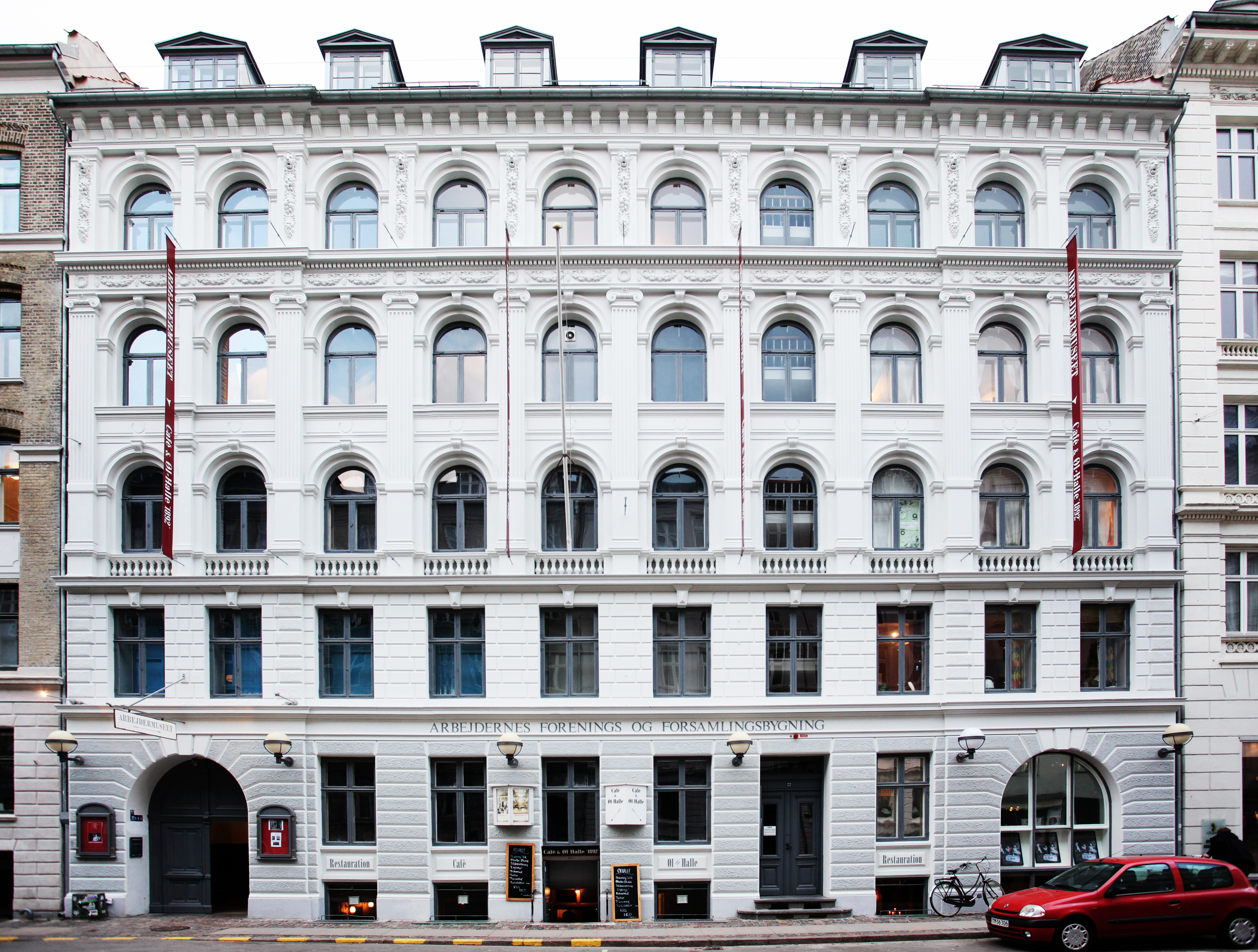
- The facade of the Workers Museum
- Established: 1982
- Location: 22 Rømersgade; Copenhagen, Denmark
- Type: Historical Museum
- Visitors: 112,267 (2017)
- Director: Søren Bak-Jensen
- Public transit access: Nørreport Station (metro, train, bus)
- Website: arbejdermuseet.dk/en/

The Workers Museum (Danish: Arbejdermuseet) is a historical museum in central Copenhagen, Denmark.

== History ==
The museum was opened in 1983. The Workers Museum is located in the Workers' Assembly Hall dating from 1879, the oldest workers' assembly hall in Europe and since 2018 a Danish UNESCO World Heritage tentative list site. The museum also includes the Labour Movement Library and Archives dating from 1909, and thus houses large and diverse collections of objects, art works, publications and archival material related to the daily life of working-class people over the past 150 years and the development of the Danish labour movement. The Workers Museum and the Labour Movement Library and Archives merged in 2004.

The museum documents the history of the Danish working class through exhibitions of how daily life and working conditions have changed since the late 19th century. The museum also documents the development of the Danish labour movement as a central factor in shaping the welfare state and modern Danish society. On the basis of these histories, the Workers Museum engages with present-day issues about social and cultural development and aims at opening larger questions up for broader debate.

The museum includes a gift shop, a 1950s style coffee bar and "Café & Ølhalle", the only listed basement restaurant in Copenhagen offering traditional Danish lunch.

== Gallery ==
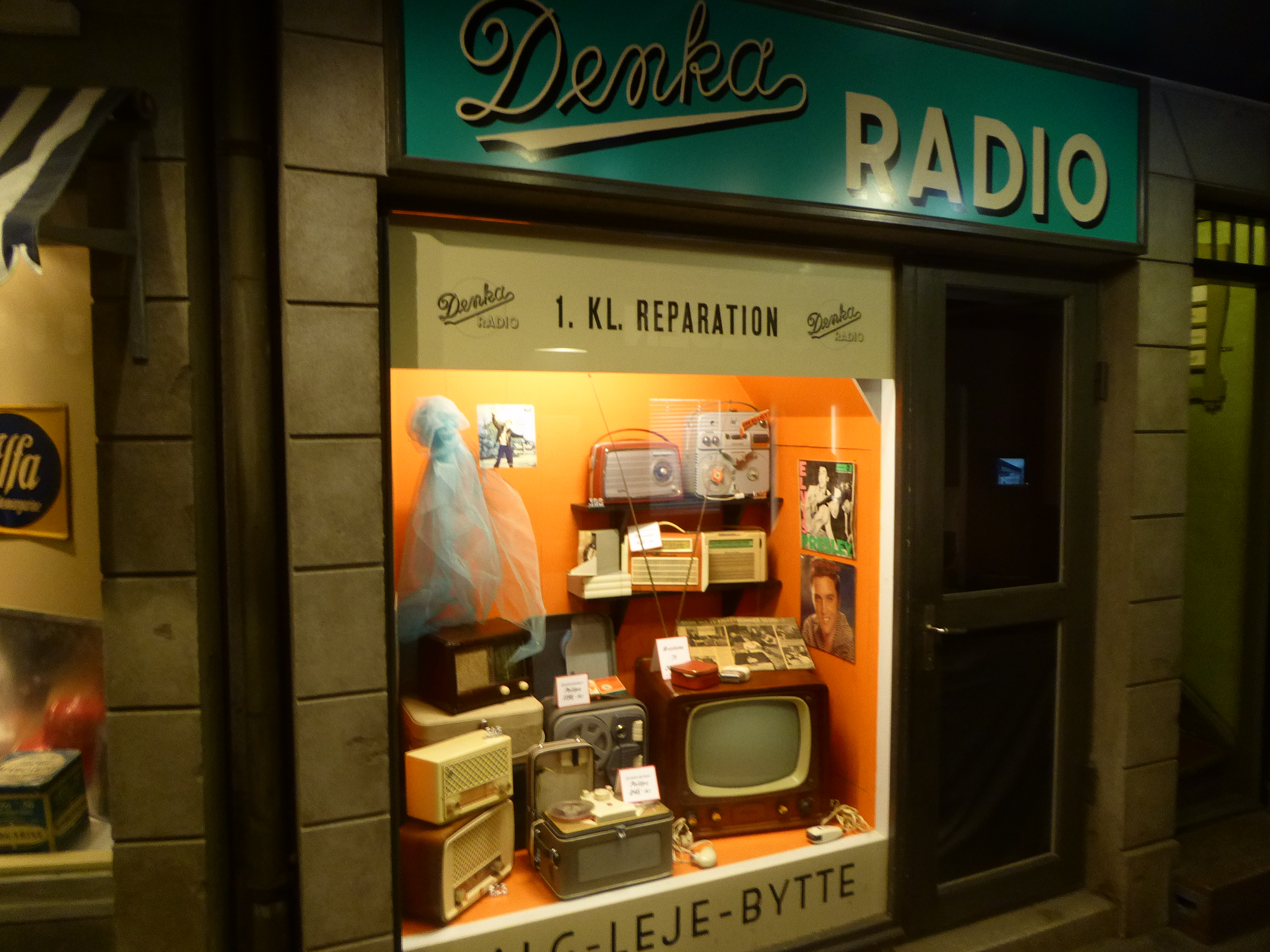

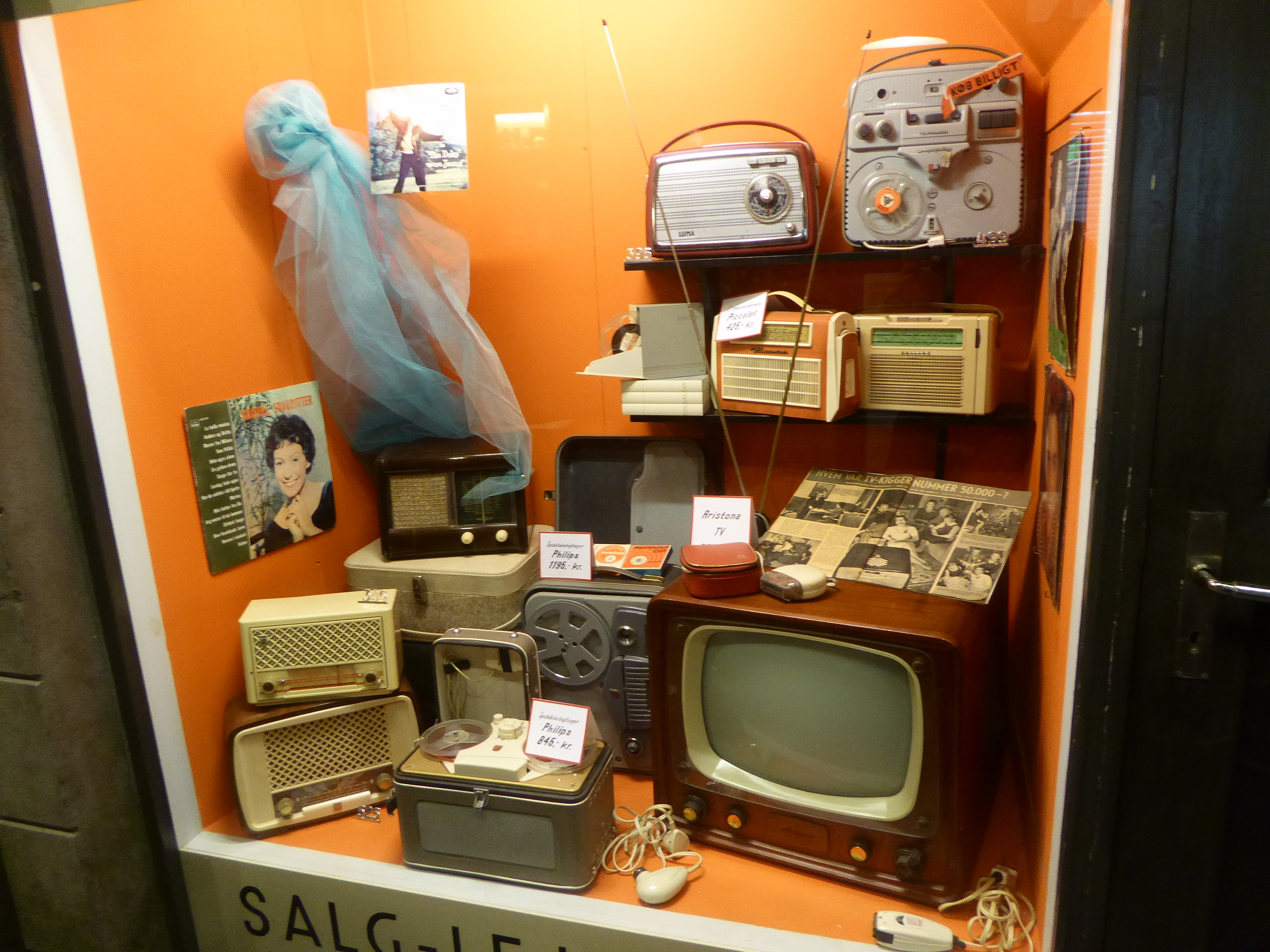

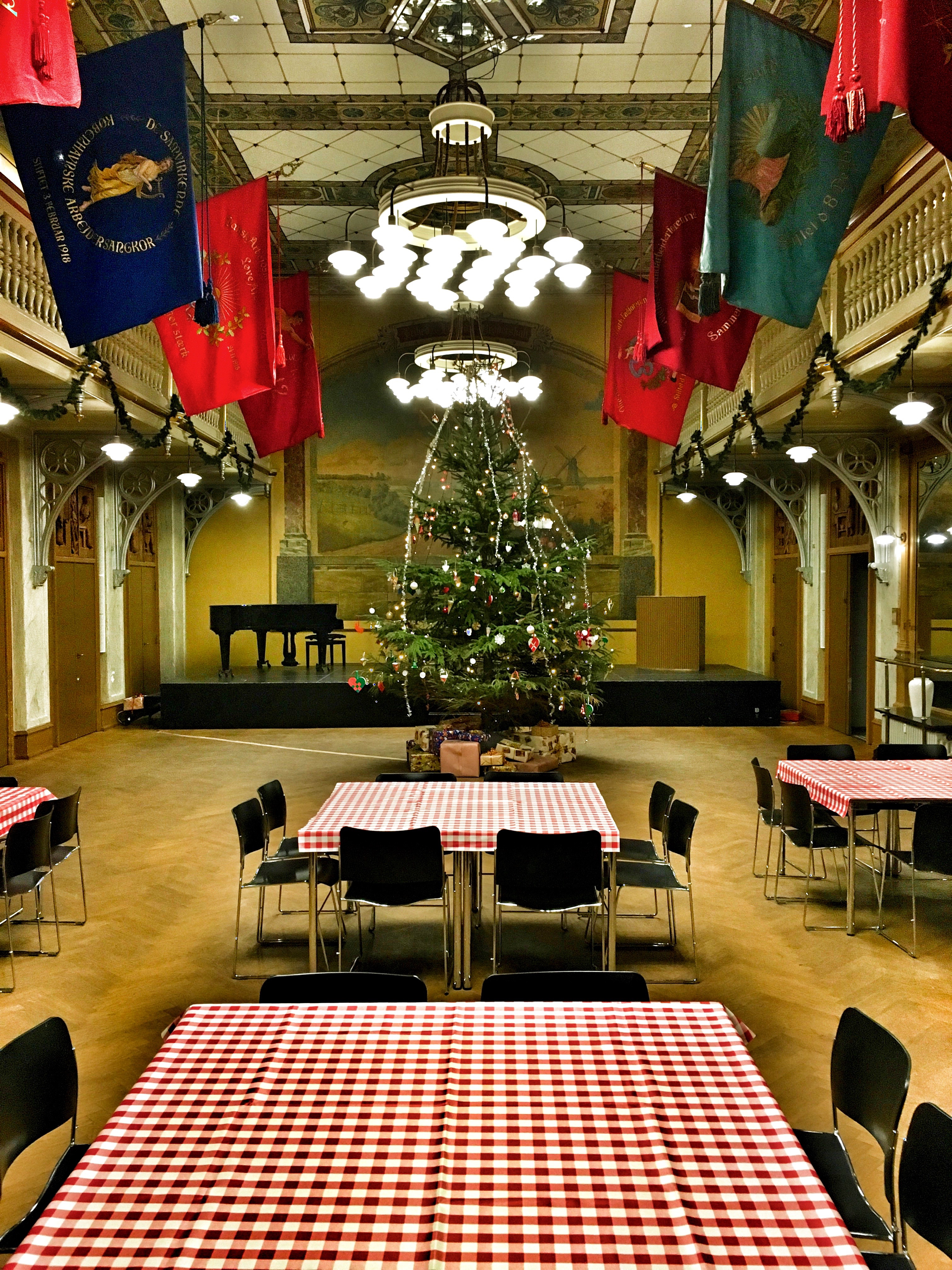

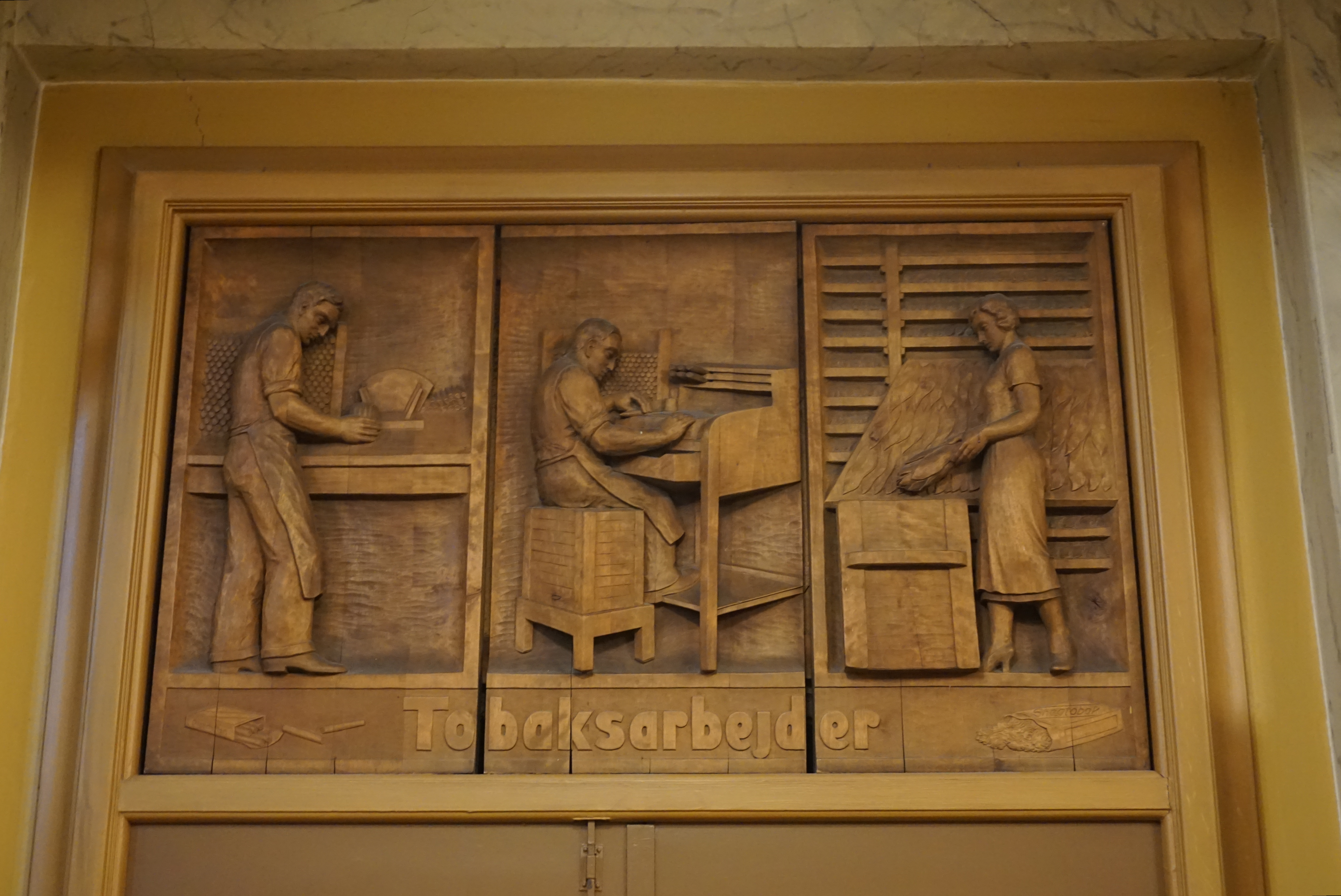
