= Inger Hanmann =

Danish artist

- Born: Inger Frimann Clausen; 7 November 1918; Stege, Denmark
- Died: 9 June 2007 (aged 88)
- Occupation(s): Drawing, painting and enamel art
- Known for: Largest enamel sculpture at Danske Bank, an enamel decoration of 100 square meters in Copenhagen Airport

Inger Frimann Hanmann (née Clausen; 7 November 1918 – 9 June 2007) was a Danish artist, specializing in painting and enamelwork. Her younger daughter Charlotte Hanmann is also a photographer, painter and graphic artist. Inger Hanman's best known enamel art works are displayed in Copenhagen Airport and Danske Bank.

== Biography ==
Inger Clausen was born on 7 November 1918 in Stege, Denmark. Her father was Niels Christoffer Clausen who was a veterinarian. Her mother was Dagmar Madsen. Her father encouraged her to take part in horse riding and boxing. At the same time she evinced keen interest in music and painting. When her father moved to Copenhagen, she went with him, taking up studies at the Design School for Women (Tegne- og Kunstindustriskolen for Kvinder) from 1935 to 1938. During these studies she was influenced by the paintings of Matisse and Picasso in the museums, and attended contemporary music and jazz concerts. She initially worked as a teacher.

Hanmann married Niels Aage Hoppe, a lawyer, on 27 April 1938. They had a daughter, Marianne. However, the marriage ended in divorce in 1947.

In 1946, Hanmann attended Peter Rostrup Bøyesen's painting school in Copenhagen, completing her studies in 1952. During this period she met Poul Hanman, a painter, and married him after divorcing her first husband. They had a daughter, Charlotte, who later became a famous a photographer and painter.

Hanmann, along with her husband, lived in a small, modest apartment in Sydhavnen in southern Copenhagen for 30 years. Later they moved to an apartment on Gammel Kongevej and established their individual ateliers. Here they taught drawing, benefiting from the earnings they received from teaching art at evening classes. Inger Hanmann also presented fashion designs in the Copenhagen newspapers while developing her own artistic style.

A change in Hanmann's career occurred when she met Marius Schou, a director at C. Schous Fabrikker, who advised her to pursue her art work adopting the medium of industrial enamel, which the company produced. This brought about a change in her art presentations as she used enamel for her decorative work. She collaborated with A. Michelsen and Georg Jensen who were silversmiths, adapting her painting style to the creation of many enamelled holloware works, some inlaid with silver and gold leaf. The effects of light and colour emanating from the enamel also exerted considerable influence on Hanman's paintings.

One of Hanmann's large enamel art works in connection with architecture is a sculpture at Landmandsbanken later merged into Danske Bank, which is the largest enamel work in the world, unveiled on the occasion of the 100th anniversary of the bank in 1971. For Copenhagen Airport, in 1989, she created an artefact in enamel which measured 100 square meters. She has also made several enamel reliefs for Stege School, Virum Hall and the swimming pool in Hørsholm. She created a large gable painting in Gammel Kongevej in 1990, and a 15 meter high movable sculpture for the new Danish embassy in Berlin in 1999.

Hanmann's non-figurative art works have been displayed at many exhibitions and in museums, nationally and internationally. She was the recipient of a grant from Denmark's National Bank Anniversary Foundation in 1984–85, and benefited from an Anne Marie Telmányi Grant in 1988.

Inger Hanmann died on 9 June 2007 and is buried in Assistens Cemetery in Copenhagen.
