= Stege Church =

Coordinates: 54°59′03″N 12°17′03″E

- Sankt Hans Church
- Stege Kirke
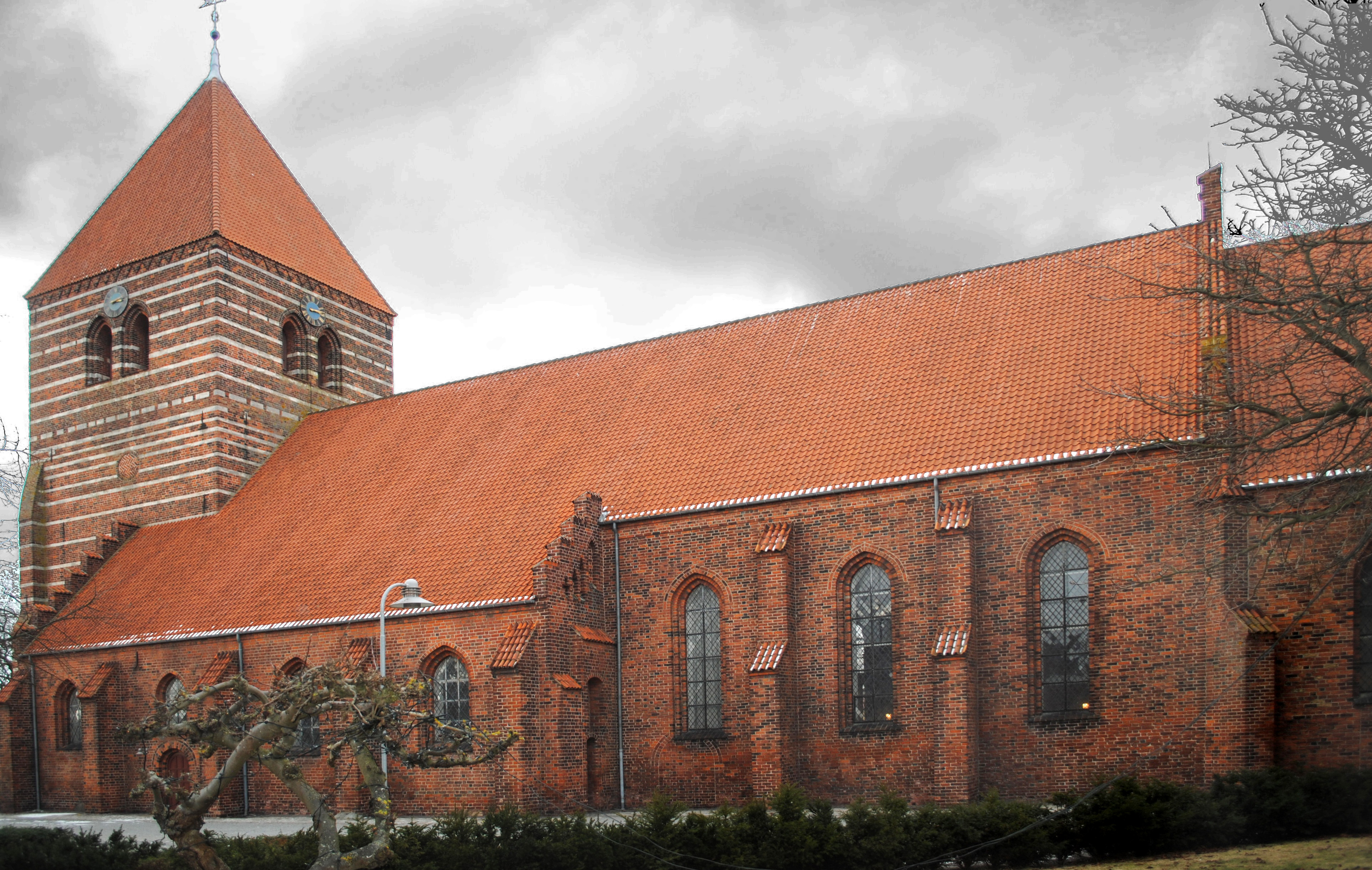
- Stege Church
- Location: Stege, Møn
- Country: Denmark
- Denomination: Church of Denmark

Architecture
- Style: Romanesque architecture, Gothic architecture
- Years built: 13th century

Administration
- Diocese: Diocese of Roskilde
- Deanery: Stege-Vordingborg Provsti
- Parish: Stege Sogn

Stege Church, also Sankt Hans Church, is a 13th-century brick church in Stege on the Danish island of Møn. Now in the Gothic architectural style, the church was originally a Romanesque building.

== Location ==
The church is located in the south of the town of Stege near the peninsula between Stege Bugt (Stege Bay) and Stege Nor (Stege Inlet). It was close to the now demolished Stege Castle which used to stand on the most southerly point of the peninsula on the channel between the sea and the inlet.

== History ==
It is not clear whether the church, now known as Sankt Hans, was originally consecrated to St John the Evangelist or St John the Baptist. There are several references to Stege in the 13th century including a mention of the parish priest of Stegeborg (Stege Castle) in 1246 at a time when there was a close relationship between the castle (now demolished) and the church. Today the church is an example of a brick Gothic building but in the walls of the nave and tower there are traces of a Late Romanesque structure which was probably built by Jakob Sunesøn, a cousin of Bishop Absalon, who ruled Møn until his death in 1246. In the second half of the 15th century, the church was rebuilt. Possibly after a fire at the east end of the church, the chancel was replaced c. 1460 by the narrow eastern section of the nave with lateral aisles, followed by a rather wider western nave with aisles and a tower which was completed by 1494.

== Architecture ==
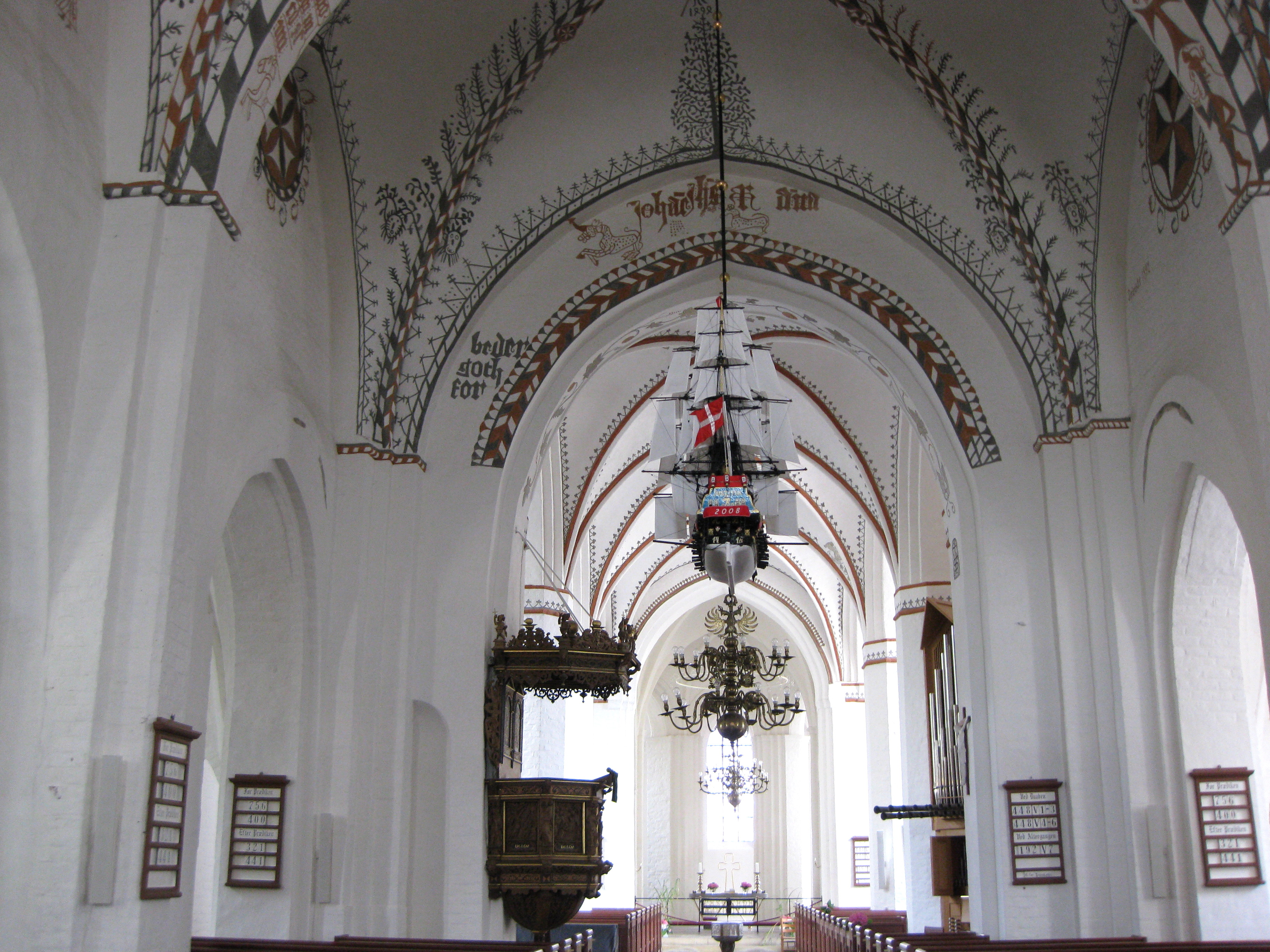
Interior

The brick building now has the overall appearance of a Gothic church. It consists of a nave divided into two sections of different breadths, a short polygonal chancel and a west tower. If the chancel was indeed rebuilt in the 1460s, it was no doubt inspired by that of Maribo Cathedral. The original Romanesque nave was divided by centrally located columns but the Gothic reconstruction was higher, had three vaulted bays and lateral aisles. On the north side of the chancel, there is a modern sacristy. The chancel, which also has lateral aisles, terminates with a polygonal eastern end which was completed in the early 16th century before the Reformation. Comprehensive restoration of the building was completed under the leadership of the architect H.B. Storck in 1909.

== Frescos ==
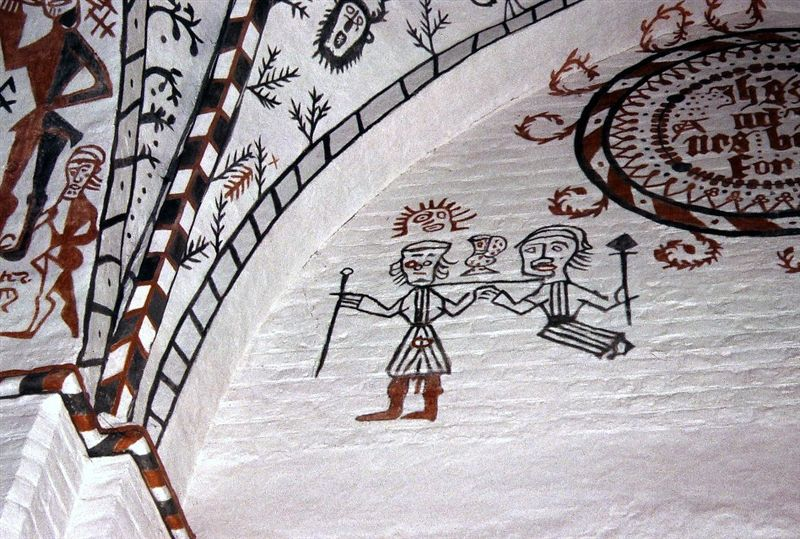
Frescos from the late 15th century

In 1892—93, Jacob Kornerup discovered and restored frescos from three different periods. Around the Romanesque windows in the nave, there are traces of black and yellow decorations. On the north wall of the main nave there is an unrestored section of little red and white roses framed with black lines, probably from the 14th century. The heightened vaults were decorated with simple, quite primitive decorations. In the western part of the nave, there is a row of grotesque heads in the vaults and on the walls. They include primitive figures of a man and a woman holding each other's hands. Another pair have swords in their hands and are tied together with a rope. There are also lively scenes of dancing and hunting. In addition to the date of 1494 (Anno dni m cd xc iiii) in a rosette, there are paintings of the Tree of Life together with John the Baptist and Mary. Another rosette contains images of apparently unfinished horses. The frescos are said to be related to carnival celebrations.

== Pulpit ==
The Cartilage Baroque carved pulpit from c. 1632 presents reliefs of the Evangelists on four flat panels framed by herms representing the seven virtues: faith, hope, charity, prudence, justice, temperance and fortitude. Additional reliefs depict the Annunciation, the Nativity, the Adoration of the Magi, the Entry into Jerusalem, the Baptism of Jesus and the Flight into Egypt. The artist is known as Mønbo H, the woodcarver who created the altarpiece in Fanefjord Church.

== Churchyard ==
Notable people buried in the churchyard include:

- Hother Hage (1816-1873), politician and editor
- Eline Boisen (1813-1871), writer
- Aage Bojsen-Mlkker (1926-2008), headmaster of Rødekilde Højskole
- Frederik Engelhart Bojsen (1841-1926), politician and headmaster of Rødekilde Højskole

== Literature ==
- Danmarks Kirker, Præstø Amt (PDF) (in Danish). Nationalmuseet. 1933. pp. 203–227.
