= Listed buildings in Roskilde Municipality =

This list of listed buildings in Roskilde Municipality lists listed buildings in Roskilde Municipality, Denmark.

== List ==
=== 3670 Veksø Sjælland ===
| Listing name | Image | Location | Coordinates | Description |
|---|---|---|---|---|
| Østrupgård | | Store Valbyvej 276, 3670 Veksø Sjælland | 55°43′35.27″N 12°12′0.95″E | |

=== 4000 Roskilde ===
| Listing name | Image | Location | Coordinates | Description |
|---|---|---|---|---|
| Algade 3 | | Algade 3, 4000 Roskilde | 55°38′28.33″N 12°4′54.32″E | The Medieval cellar |
| Algade 13: Hotel Prindsen | | Algade 13, 4000 Roskilde | 55°38′28.4″N 12°5′0.46″E | Main wing on Algade and extension on Rosenhavestræde from 1875 to 1876 designed by Ove Petersen |
| Algade 15: Bryggergården | | Algade 15A, 4000 Roskilde | 55°38′28.45″N 12°5′2.52″E | Building from c. 1650 |
| Algade 15: Bryggergården | | Algade 15G, 4000 Roskilde | 55°38′28.81″N 12°5′3.47″E | The half-timbered part of the side wing along Rosenhavestræde |
| Bondetinget 4 | | Bondetinget 4, 4000 Roskilde | 55°38′32″N 12°4′42.59″E | Residential building from 1844 designed by Gustav Friedrich Hetsch consisting of a two-storey main wing fronting the street and two rear wings |
| Bondetinget 17 | | Bondetinget 17, 4000 Roskilde | 55°38′30.32″N 12°4′36.31″E | House from c. 1600 |
| Bondetinget 19 | | Bondetinget 19, 4000 Roskilde | 55°38′30.34″N 12°4′35.6″E | House from 1851 |
| Bukkehøjgård | | Østermarken 4, 4000 Roskilde | 1778 | |
| Bukkehøjgård | | Østermarken 4, 4000 Roskilde | 1778 | |
| Bukkehøjgård | | Østermarken 4, 4000 Roskilde | 1900 | |
| Bukkehøjgård | | Østermarken 4, 4000 Roskilde | 1778 | |
| Danish Distillers | | Møllehusene 5, 4000 Roskilde | 55°38′3.29″N 12°4′22.7″E | Whiskyfabrikken from 1906 without the l-shaped building to the west |
| Danish Distillers | | Ringstedgade 76A, 4000 Roskilde | 55°38′2.14″N 12°4′21.73″E | Administration building from 1849 |
| Danish Distillers | | Ringstedgade 78, 4000 Roskilde | 55°38′2.04″N 12°4′22.67″E | Detached side wing |
| Domkirkestræde 8 | | Domkirkestræde 8, 4000 Roskilde | 55°38′33.59″N 12°4′55.13″E | House from 1845 |
| Domprovstegården | | Domkirkepladsen 4, 4000 Roskilde | 55°38′35.99″N 12°4′52.15″E | Provost's House: The main wing from 1843 and the medieval cellar under the south wing |
| Domprovstegården | | Domkirkepladsen 4, 4000 Roskilde | 55°38′35.99″N 12°4′52.15″E | Half-ttimbered stable |
| Duebrødre Kloster | | Bredgade 2A, 4000 Roskilde | 55°38′22.21″N 12°4′51.7″E | Building from 1841 |
| Farvergården | | Ringstedgade 3A, 4000 Roskilde | 55°38′25.42″N 12°4′33.89″E | Main wing fronting Ringstedgade 1857 designed by Mathias Brock, altered in the 1860s by H. S. Sibbern |
| Farvergården | | Skomagergade 33A, 4000 Roskilde | 55°38′26.15″N 12°4′33.97″E | Main wing fronting Skomagergade (1766–67) and side wing on Ringstedgade |
| Greyfriars Cemetery: Gate, wall and chapel | | Store Gråbrødrestræde 12B, 4000 Roskilde | 55°38′22.9″N 12°5′11.99″E | Chapel from 1856 to 1857 by Henning Wolff and Ferdinand Meldahl etc., the wall around the cemetery from 1853 by Ferdinand Meldahl and the entrance portal from 1853 by Henning Wolff |
| Hejnstrupgård | | Hejnstrupvej 35, 4000 Roskilde | 55°43′51.86″N 12°8′38.29″E | |
| Hejnstrupgård | | Hejnstrupvej 35, 4000 Roskilde | 55°43′51.86″N 12°8′38.29″E | |
| Kastellet | | Byvolden 25A, 4000 Roskilde | 55°38′37″N 12°4′23.35″E | |
| Kastellet | | Byvolden 25A, 4000 Roskilde | 55°38′37″N 12°4′23.35″E | |
| Kastellet | | Byvolden25B, 4000 Roskilde | 55°38′37.36″N 12°4′23.35″E | |
| Klosterkilden | | Dronning Margrethes Vej 1, 4000 Roskilde | 55°38′36.45″N 12°5′10.37″E | Spring in grotto |
| Konventhuset | | Store Gråbrødrestræde 12B, 4000 Roskilde | 55°38′33.92″N 12°4′52.92″E | |
| Maglekilde | | Maglekildevej 0, 4000 Roskilde | 55°38′34.39″N 12°4′36.22″E | |
| Meyercrones Stiftelse | | Domkirkepladsen 2, 4000 Roskilde | 55°38′36.08″N 12°4′48.71″E | Building from 1833 and the surrounding walls |
| Rektorbolig | | Skolegade 3, 4000 Roskilde | 55°38′33.21″N 12°4′43.66″E | |
| Rektorbolig | | Skolegade 3, 4000 Roskilde | 55°38′33.21″N 12°4′43.66″E | |
| Rektorbolig | | Skolegade 3, 4000 Roskilde | 55°38′33.21″N 12°4′43.66″E | |
| Roskilde Hvile | | Københavnsvej 66A, 4000 Roskilde | 55°38′27.77″N 12°6′21.01″E | Main building from 1853 fronting the road |
| Roskilde Hvile | | Københavnsvej 66F, 4000 Roskilde | 55°38′27.77″N 12°6′21.01″E | Two-storey western est wing from 1853 which was extended in 1857 |
| L. A. Ring House | | Havnevej 25, 4000 Roskilde | 55°38′53.06″N 12°4′35.21″E | Former home of the painter L. A. Ring: House from 1913 to 1914 designed by Andreas Clemmensen and the rough iron garden gate |
| Roskilde Gasworks | | 1A Vindeboder, 4000 Roskilde | 55°38′53.8″N 12°4′42.07″E | The former main building from 1863 with later extensions and alterations from 1899 and 1930 |
| Roskilde Jomfrukloster | | Sankt Peders Stræde 8A, 4000 Roskilde | 55°38′30.28″N 12°5′12.98″E | |
| Roskilde Jomfrukloster | | Sankt Peders Stræde 8B, 4000 Roskilde | 55°38′31.19″N 12°5′10.05″E | Old wing from c. 1550 which was refurbished in 1670 |
| Roskilde Jomfrukloster | | Sankt Peders Stræde 8E, 4000 Roskilde | 55°38′31.25″N 12°5′11.71″E | |
| Roskilde State School | | Domkirkepladsen 1, 4000 Roskilde | 55°38′31.91″N 12°4′46.4″E | Educational building from 1842 designed by Jørgen Hansen Koch |
| Roskilde Mansion | | Stændertorvet 3A, 4000 Roskilde | 55°38′32.96″N 12°4′54.27″E | |
| Roskilde Mansion | | Stændertorvet 3B, 4000 Roskilde | 55°38′32.04″N 12°4′55.54″E | |
| Roskilde Mansion | | Stændertorvet 3C, 4000 Roskilde | 55°38′42″N 12°4′52.19″E | |
| Roskilde Mansion | | Stændertorvet 3D, 4000 Roskilde | 55°38′31.59″N 12°4′52.77″E | |
| Roskilde Mansion: Den gamle Husarstald | | Stændertorvet 3F, 4000 Roskilde | 55°38′30.68″N 12°4′56.68″E | 52-bay, half-timbered stable building from the 18th century |
| Roskilde railway station | | Jernbanegade 1A, 4000 Roskilde | 55°38′21.16″N 12°5′19.72″E | Station building from 1847 |
| Rughavegård | | 11A Sankt Hans Gade, 4000 Roskilde | 55°38′43.36″N 12°4′28.12″E | House from 1854 |
| Sankt Clara Mølle | | Havnevej 17A, 4000 Roskilde | 55°38′49.91″N 12°4′34.43″E | House from 1831 |
| Sankt Hans Hospital: Kurhuset | | Boserupvej 2, 4000 Roskilde | 55°39′0.83″N 12°4′6.31″E | |
| Sankt Hans Kilde | | Tuttesti 0, 4000 Roskilde | 55°38′38.2″N 12°4′48″E | |
| St Ib's Church | | Sankt Ibs Vej 2, 4000 Roskilde | 55°38′51.62″N 12°4′58.58″E | |
| Sankt Laurentii Church Tower | | Stændertorvet 1, 4000 Roskilde | 55°38′28.87″N 12°4′48.74″E | |
| Sugar House/Liebe House | | Sankt Ols Gade 18, 4000 Roskilde | 55°38′32.95″N 12°4′59.98″E | Liebe House |
| Sugar House/Liebe House | | Sankt Ols Stræde 1, 4000 Roskilde | 55°38′32.47″N 12°5′0.25″E | Sugar House. |
| Viking Ship Museum | | Sankt Clara Vej 41, 4000 Roskilde | 1966 | Museum building and its immediate surroundings from 1966 to 1968 designed by Erik Christian Sørensen. |
| Weber House | | Skolegade 5A, 4000 Roskilde | 1850. | |
| Weber House | | Skolegade7A, 4000 Roskilde | 1850. | |
| Weber House | | Skolegade 7B, 4000 Roskilde | | |
| Wilhelm Topps Minde | | Skolegade 11, 4000 Roskilde | 55°38′34.9″N 12°4′45.58″E | |

=== 4040 Jyllinge ===
| Listing name | Image | Location | Coordinates | Description |
|---|---|---|---|---|
| Jyllinge Forge | | Smedestræde 1, 4040 Jyllinge | 55°45′14.23″N 12°6′12.75″E | |
| Jyllinge Forge | | Smedestræde 1, 4040 Jyllinge | 55°45′14.23″N 12°6′12.75″E | |

=== 4130 Viby Sjælland ===
| Listing name | Image | Location | Coordinates | Description |
|---|---|---|---|---|
| Birkede School | | Møllevej 16, 4130 Viby Sjælland | 55°32′5.7″N 12°0′10.88″E | School building from 1914 and six lime trees |
| Birkede School | | Møllevej 16, 4130 Viby Sjælland | 55°32′5.7″N 12°0′10.88″E | Storage building from 1914 |
| Railway bridges at Birkede | | Birkede Brovej 0, 4130 Viby Sjælland | c. 1920 | Viaduct from c. 1920 carrying the Birkede-Dåstrup road crossing the Vestbanen railway line, |
| Railway bridges at Birkede | | Møllevej 0, 4130 Viby Sjælland | 1853 | Viaduct from 1853 carrying the Birkede-Søster Svenstrup road across the Vestbanen railway line. |

== See also ==
- List of churches in Roskilde Municipality
