= Farvergården =

Farvergården may refer to:

- Farvergården, a property in Copenhagen
- Farvergården, Kerteminde, a property in Kerteminde
- Farvergården, Roskilde, a property in Roskilde
