= Nørregade 4 =

Mørregade 4 may refer to:

- Nørregade 4, Copenhagen, heritage listed building in Copenhagen
- Nørregade 4, heritage listed building in Ærøskøbing
