= Rasmus Hansen Lange =

Danish Supreme Court attorney

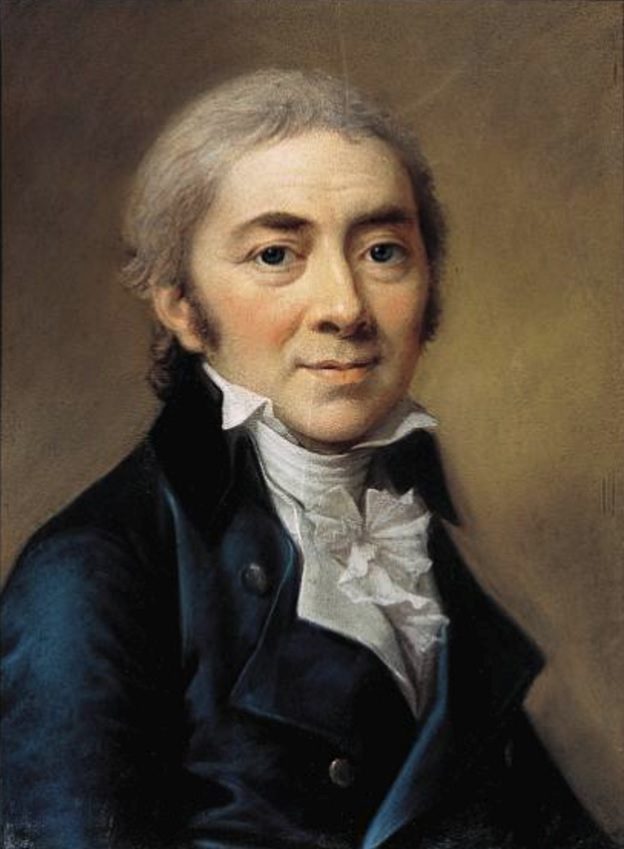
Rasmus Lange

Rasmus Hansen Lange (20 March 1752 – 8 April 1829) was a Danish Supreme Court attorney, councilman, hospital director and developer. The listed properties at Skindergade 44 and Kompagnistræde 8 in Copenhagen were both built for him. He was a member of Knud Lyne Rahbek's social circle.

== Early life and education ==
Lange was born on 20 March 1752 in Frederikssund, the son of Hans Rasmussen Lange and Maren Laura Larsdatter Cappell. His father was a wealthy merchant, dyer and councilman.

He graduated from Roskilde Cathedral School in 1769. and acquired his cand. jur. degree from the University of Copenhagen in 1773. The father's business in Frederikssund was continued by Rasmus Lange's younger half-brother Jørgen Hansen Lange (1765–1831).

== Career ==
In 1777, Lange was licensed as a lawyer in Copenhagen, then part of Denmark–Norway. In 1781, he qualified as a Supreme Court attorney. From 1796 to 1819, Lange served as manager of the West Indies Warehouse under the Generaltoldkammeret. From 1810 to 1821, he also served as director of Frederick's Royal Hospital.

== Politics and appointments ==
In 1806, he was elected as councilman in Copenhagen. In 1809, he was appointed justitsraad. In 1819, he was appointed etatsraad.

From 1798 to 1829, he served as manager of Den Langeske Stiftelse in Roskilde.

== Personal life ==
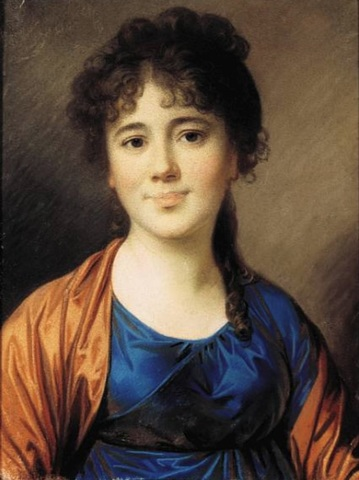
Frederikke Lange

Lange married Frederikke Christine Hellesen (1761–1845) on 7 January 1789 in St. Nicolas' Church. The couple had no children. They were members of Knud Lyhne Rahbek's social circle. He is frequently mentioned in Rahbek's memoirs.

Lange owned the property at Nørregade 4 in Copenhagen (then No. 24*/245). He was the owner of a comprehensive library. The building was destroyed during the British bombardment of Copenhagen in 1807. He was also active as a real estate developer and investor. The listed buildings at Skindergade 44 and Kompagnistræde (1800) in Copenhagen were thus both built and owned by him.

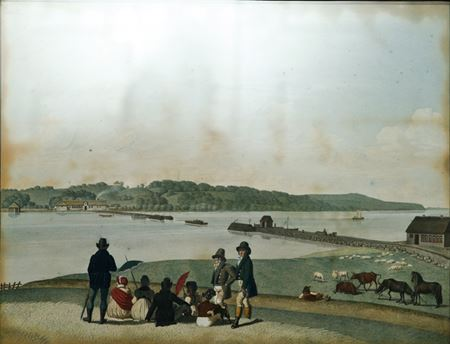
Senn's painting of the Lange family at the ferry crossing in Frederikssund (1809).

Lange died on 8 April 1829 and is buried in Assistens Cemetery. His home was located at Løngangsstræde No. 171.

He is seen together with other members of the Lange family in an 1809 painting by the German-Swiss painter Johannes Senn (1780–1861).

The other people seen in the painting are customs inspector Lauge Severin Fanøe, Marie Margrethe Fanøe (née Lange), Frederikke Lange (née Hellesen), ferryman and royal actor Hans Christian Knudsen, Sophie Frederikke Lange (née Knudsen), Lange's brother Jørgen Hansen Lange and nephew Rasmus Lange.
