= Farvergården, Roskilde =

Building in Roskilde, Denmark

Farvergården
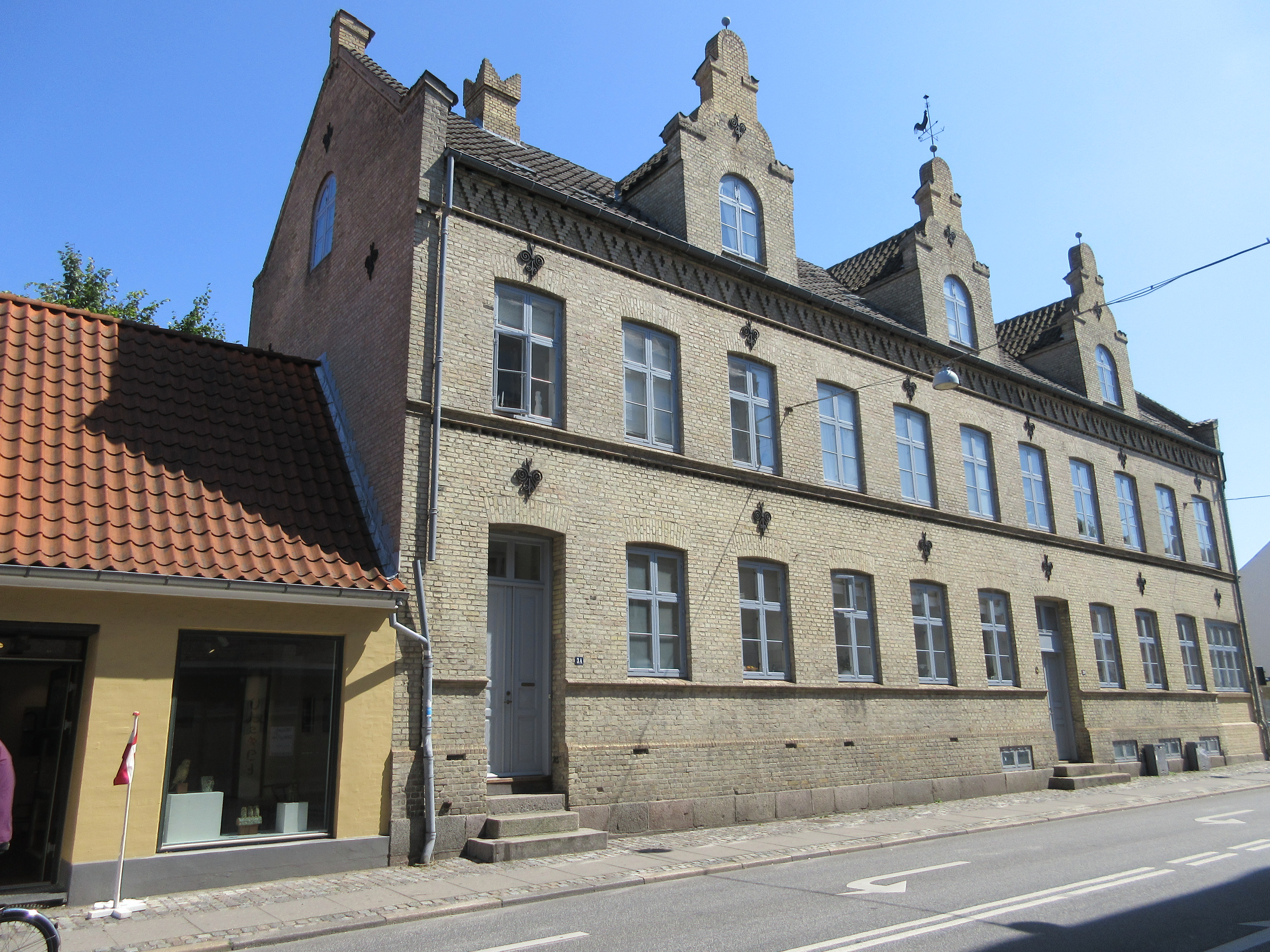
- Interactive map of the Farvergården area

General information
- Architectural style: Late Neoclassical
- Location: Roskilde, Denmark
- Coordinates: 55°38′26.16″N 12°4′33.96″E
- Completed: 1767 (Skomagergade), 1860s (Ringstedgade 4)
- Owner: Roskilde Domsogns Menighedsråd

Farvergården is a historic property at the corner of Skomagergade and Ringstedgade in central Roskilde, Denmark. It consists of an ehgith-bay-long, single-storey building from 1766-67 on Skomagergade and a two-storey building from the 1850s on Ringstedghade. The latter was adapted by the architect in the 1860s. The entire complex was listed on the Danish register of protected buildings and places in 1979.

== History ==
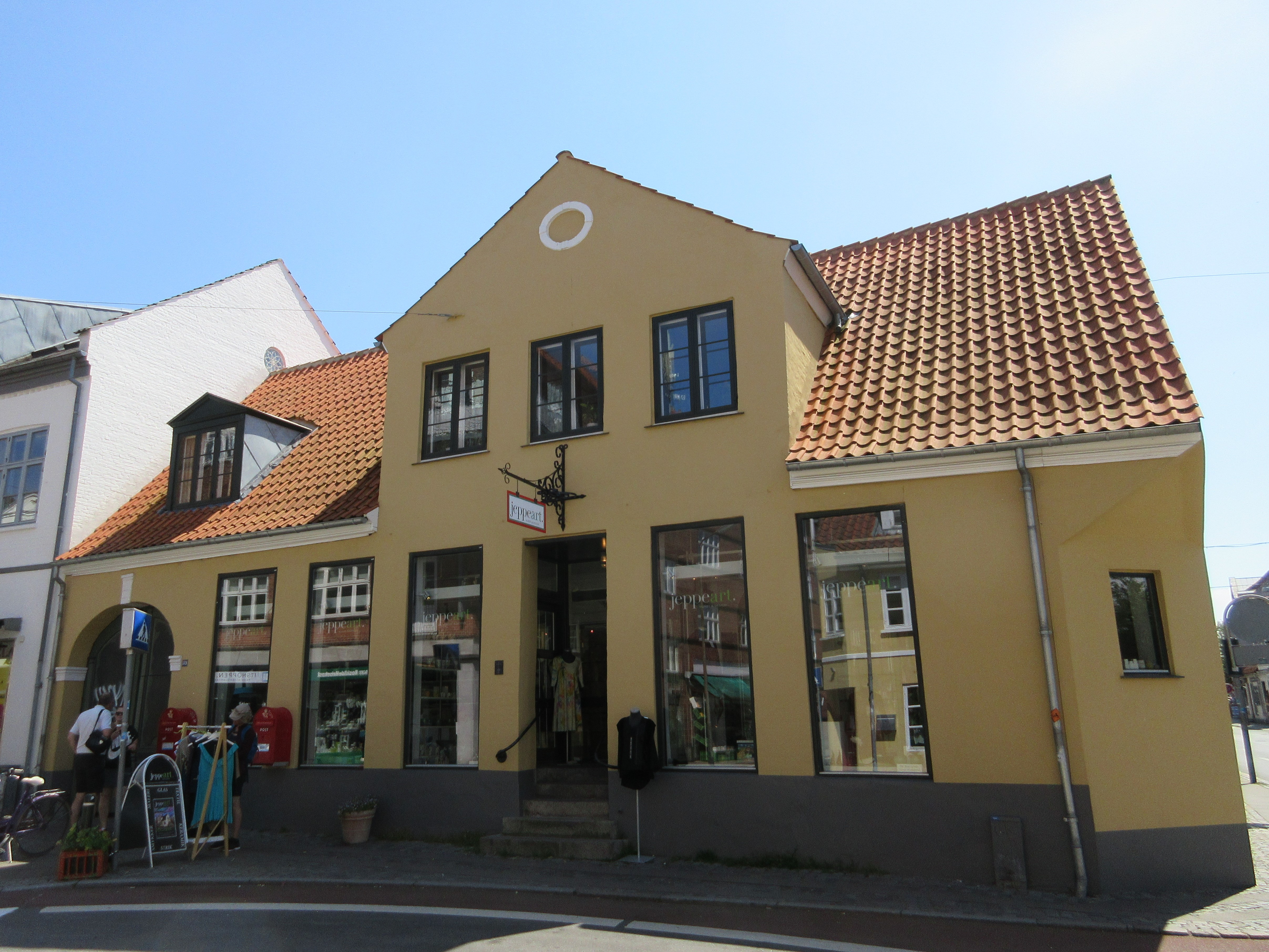
Skomagergade 33..

In the first half of the 18th century, Anders Rasmussen Lange (1684-1749) bought a large property at the corner of Skomagergade and Ringstedgade. In 1765, it was acquired by his son Rasmus Lange. Rasmus Lnage had served as mayor of Roskilde since 1763. He divided the site into two separate properties, selling the corner property to his brother-in-law Johan Hørgen Holst. Holst had also headed the consortium which had constructed the city's sugar house (now part of Roskilde Museum). In 1766, Holst started the construction of a house on his new property. The house had not yet been completed when Holst died in early 1767. The building was subsequently completed by his widow Maren in collaboration with Lange.

In 1775, Holst sold the property to a wine merchant from Copenhagen. In 1777, he sold the property the Roskilde's Magistracy. The house was subsequently used as residence of the head of Roskilde Hussard Barracks.

In 1810, Roskilde's Magistracy sold the property to a master painter. It changed hands several times over the next decades.

In 1839, Hans Poul Hammer (1803-87) purchased property. Born in Jutland, he had later settled as a dyer in Korsør. His new dyeing plant was located in the Ringstedgade wing. A new two-storey building was also constructed in the courtyard. In the 1850s, he replaced the Ringstedgade wing with a new building. It was constructed for him by master mason Matthias Vrock. It was later adapted by the architect H. S. Sibbern.

Hammer had five children. His son Hans Gunner W. Hammer (1836-1893) joined the father's business, He was a member of the local association of craftsmen and shooting society. He inherited the property and associated business upon his father's death but died just six years. later. The company was subsequently continued by his widow Cathrine Emilie Hammer (1842-1919) . She was assisted by their daughter, Caroline Frederikke Hammer (1866-1939), who in 1900 gave up her job as a teacher at Borgerskolen to help out in the family business. They opened a sjop in the building on Skomagergade. The dyeing plant was later shot down. She died in 1939. The property was subsequently sold to bookdealer J.O. Schwartz.

In 1964, Roskilde Municipality bought the building. The plan was to demolish the building in connection with a planned widening of the street. This plan was later abandoned. In 1975, Farvergården was instead put through a comprehensive restoration. The building was listed on the Danish register of protected buildings and places in 1979.

== See also ==
- Rasmus Hansen Lange, a cousin of mayor Rasmus Lange
