= Maglekilde Machine Factory =

Factory in Roskilde, Denmark

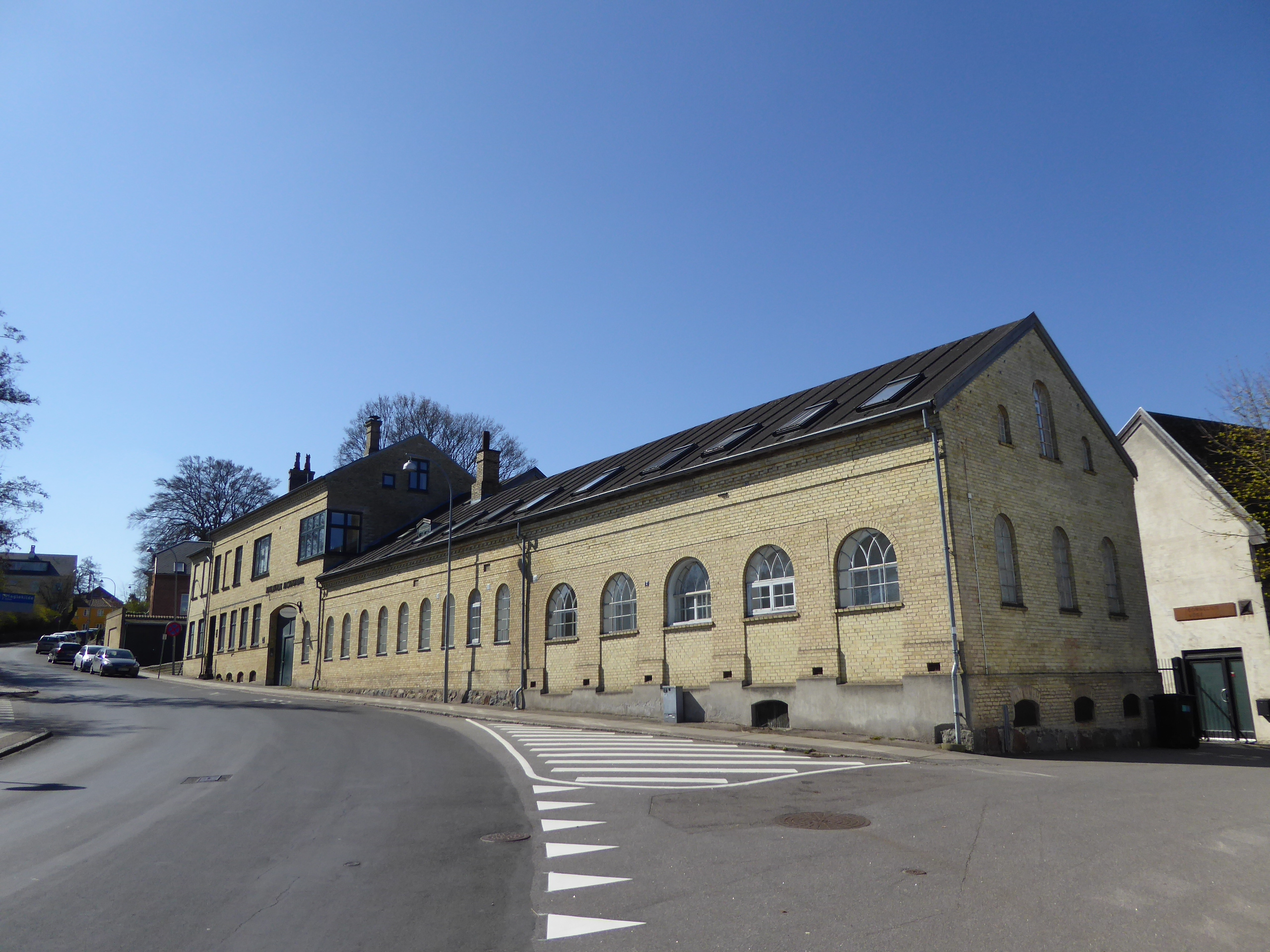
The former Maglekilde Machine Factory in 2019

Maglekilde Machine Factory (Danish: Maglekilde Maskinfabrik) was a machine factory founded in 1865 in Roskilde, Denmark. A continuous cream-milk separator marketed by the company in 1878 played a key role in the growth of the Danish dairy industry and increased export of butter in the late 19th century.

== History ==
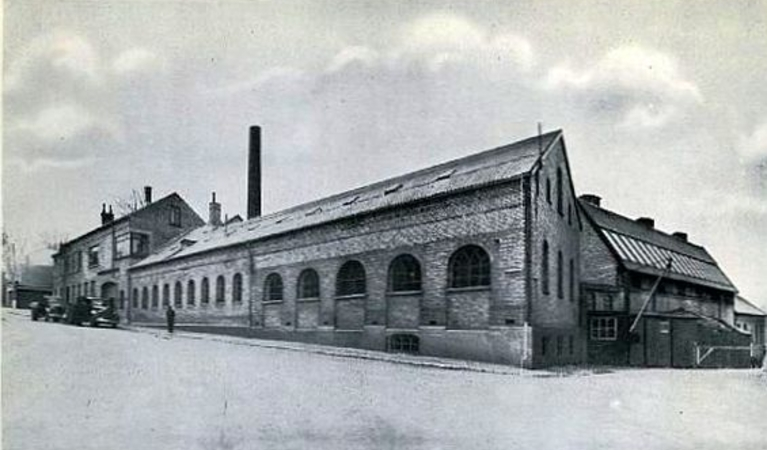
The factory from 1877

Maglekilde Machine Factory was founded as O.Petersen & Co. Jernstøberi, Maskinfabrik, Værktøjsfabrik og Træskæreri by master smith Ole Petersen in Ruds Vedby in 1865. In 1865, he purchased the former Maglekilde Spa Complex in Roskilde.

The operations were initially powered by water from Maglekilde but it was soon supplemented by steam power. A large new factory was completed on the other side of the street in 1877.

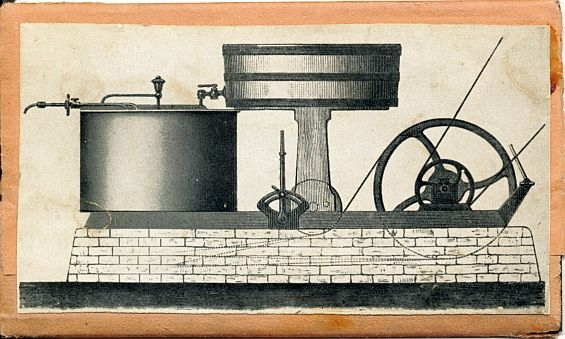
O. Petersen & Co.'s continuous cream-milk separator

The machine factory specialized in machinery. In 1878, it launched the sale of a new continuous centrifugal cream-milk separator. It revolutionalized the Danish dairy industry, paving the way for the opening of many new industrial dairies and a rapid increase in Danish butter exports. Maglekilde was unable to meet the demand and after a few years sold the patent to Burmeister & Wain.

The company was renamed Maglekilde Machine Factory (Maglekilde Maskinfabrik) by a new owner in 1903.

== Today ==
The former Maglekilde Spa Complex where the company was based from 1867 to 1988 was demolished in 1972. The factory from 1877 has been converted into offices and dwellings. They are listed with high preservation value (SAVE value 3).
