= Frederiks Hospital =

Early hospital in Denmark

Coordinates: 55°41′12″N 12°35′33″E

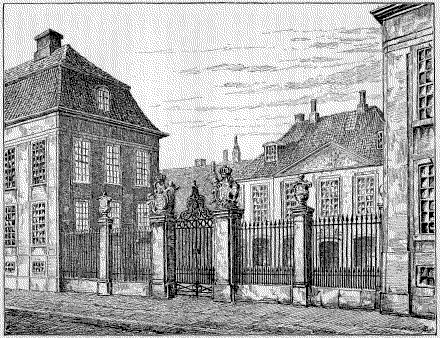
Frederiks Hospital

The hospital, likely in 1752 or shortly thereafter.

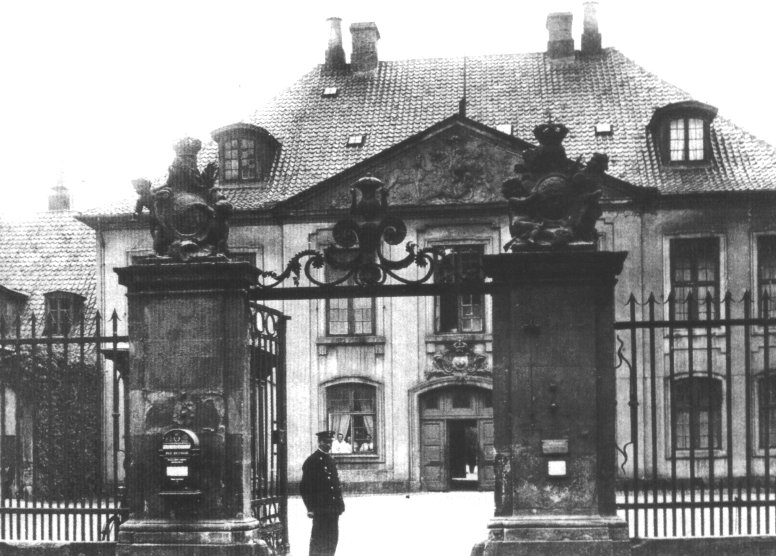
Frederiks Hospital, approximately 1900

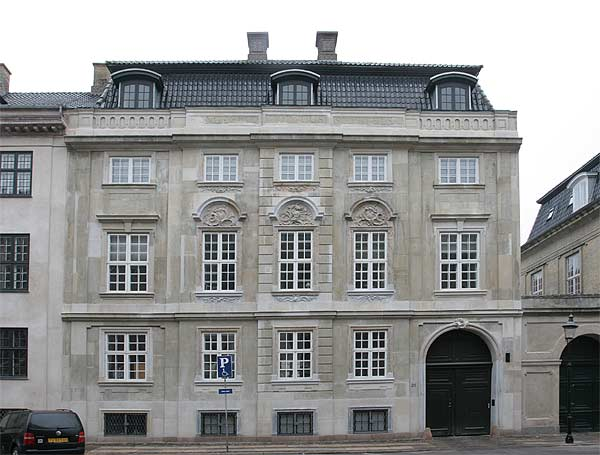
Recent photo of the old maternity house in Amaliegade, architect Lauritz de Thurah

The royal Frederiks Hospital was Denmark's first hospital in the present-day meaning of the word. It was founded by king Frederik V and financed by the earnings from the Norwegian Postal Service.

The buildings, situated in Bredgade in Copenhagen and currently housing the Danish Museum of Art & Design, were, along with the rest of Frederiksstaden, designed by Nicolai Eigtved and Lauritz de Thurah and built in 1752-1757. It opened on March 31, 1757 on the birthday of Frederick V.

The hospital was run as an independent institution with the purpose of giving free care and cure to patients without means. About two thirds of the patients were treated free of charge. It was at one time the seat of the Fødsels- og Pleiestiftelsen.

Until 1848 Frederiks Hospital was managed by the Danish Chancellory, from 1848 to 1871 by the Ministry of Justice and from there on by the Ministry of Church and Education. On November 11, 1855, the philosopher Søren Kierkegaard died here.

The hospital was closed in 1910 with the founding of Rigshospitalet. The building was remodelled in the 1920s to house the Danish Museum of Decorative Art, now the Danish Museum of Art & Design.

== Directors ==
- (1810-1821) Rasmus Hansen Lange
