= Nørregade 4, Copenhagen =

Historic building in Copenhagen

Nørregade 4
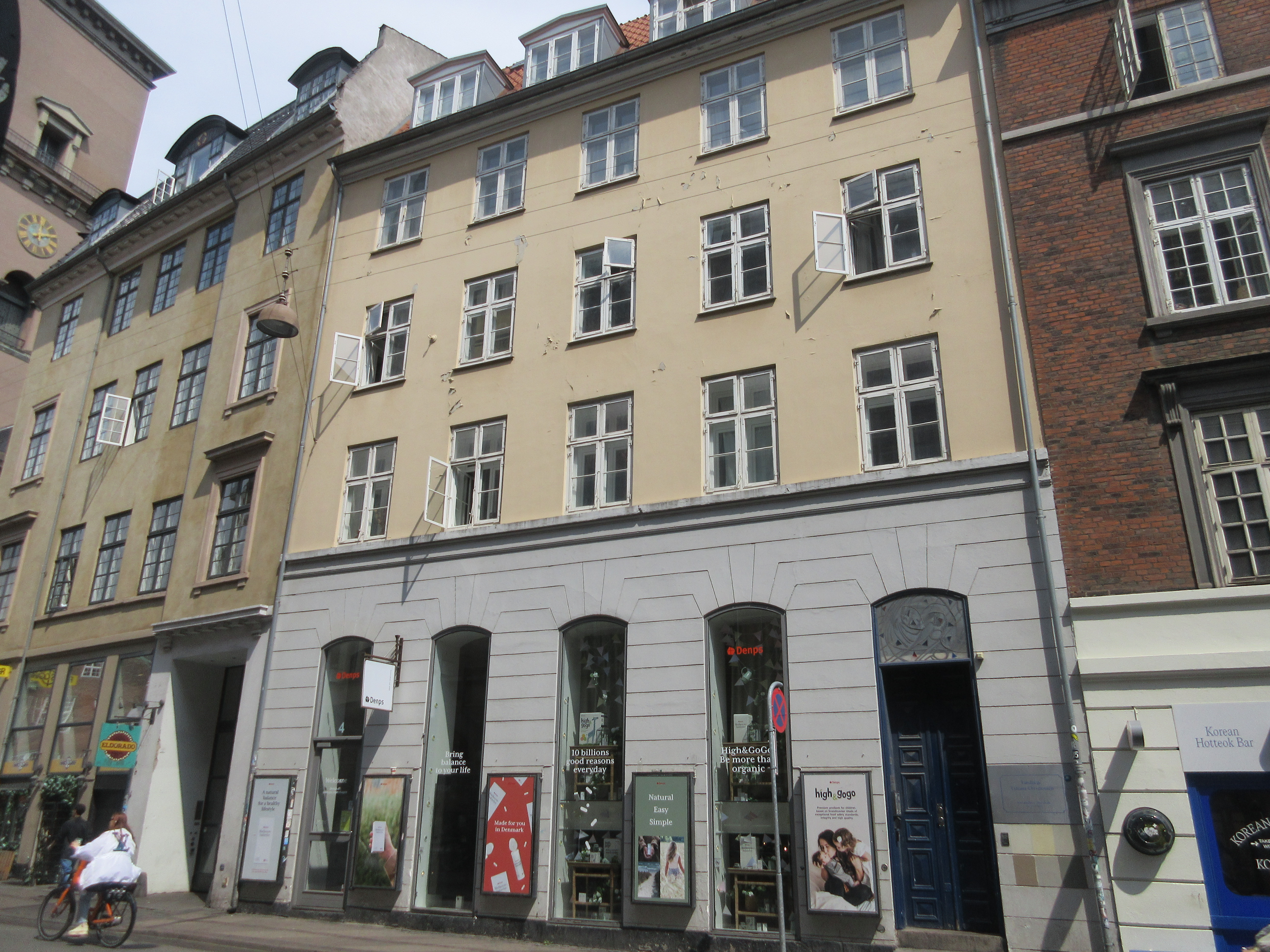
- Interactive map of the Nørregade 4 area

General information
- Location: Copenhagen, Denmark
- Coordinates: 55°40′43.5″N 12°34′20.21″E
- Completed: 1811
- Renovated: 1852

Nørregade 4 is an early 19th-century property situated in Nørregade, between Frue Plads and Gammeltorv, in the Old Town of Copenhagen, Denmark. The building was listed in the Danish registry of protected buildings and places in 1945.

== History ==
=== 17th century ===
The site was formerly part of two smaller properties, listed in Copenhagen's first cadastre of 1689 as No. 241 and No. 242 in Klædebo Quarter. One was owned by Antoni Rentz (No. 241) and the other was owned by wine seller (vintapper) Ebbe Levesen (No. 242).

=== 18th century ===
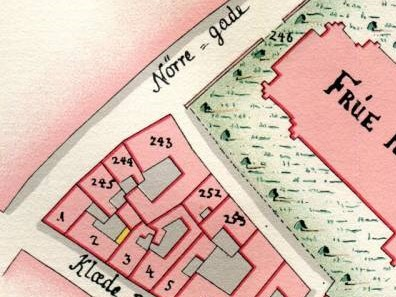
No. 244 and No. 245 seen in a detail from Christian Gedde's map of Klædebo Quarter, 1757

In the new cadastre of 1756, the old No. 241 was listed as No. 244. It was by then owned by tinker (kandestøber) Jørgen Jørgensen Wissing. The old No. 242 was listed as No. 245 and was owned by joiner Johan Pedersen.

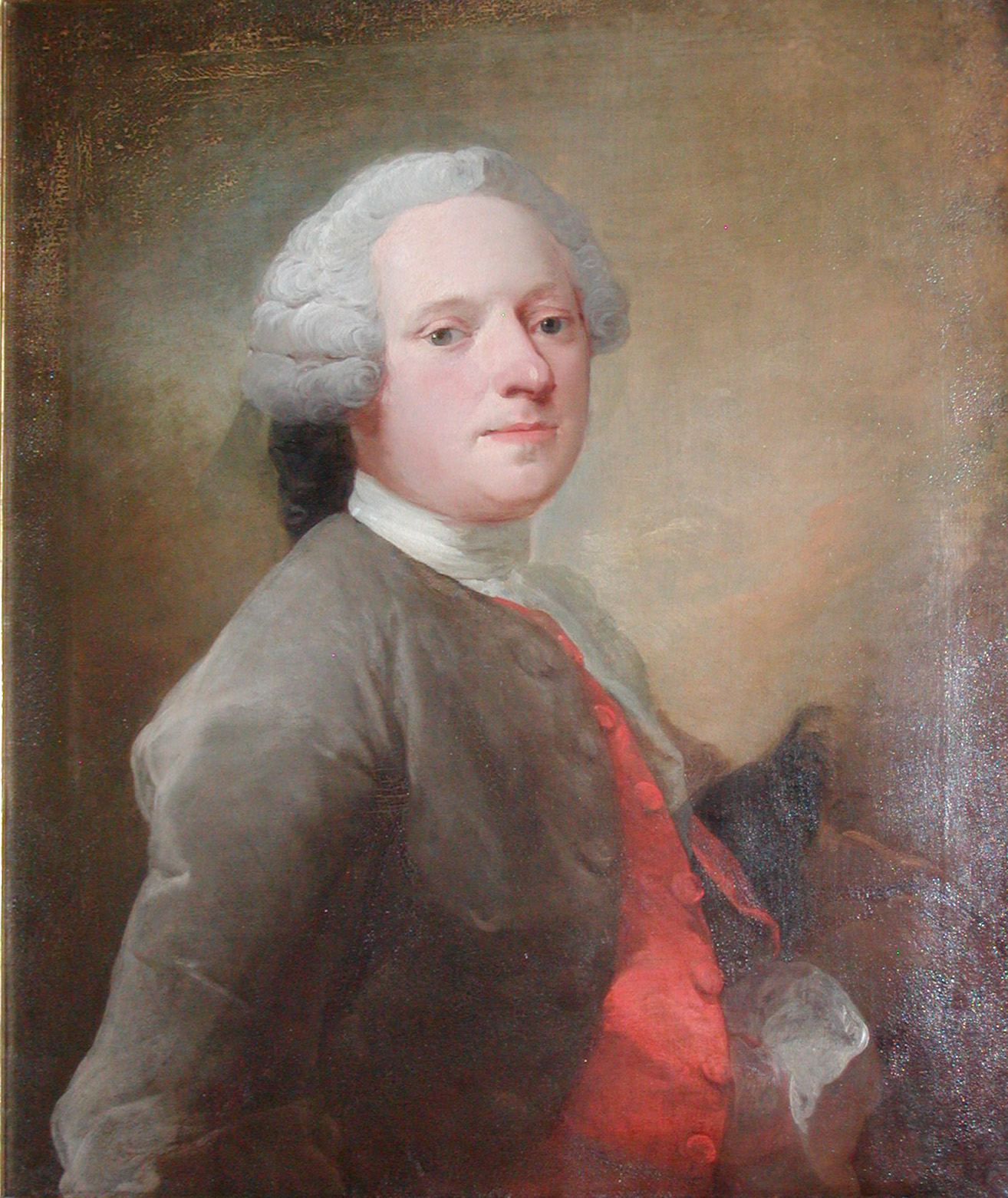
Gabriel Linde painted by Pilo

No. 241 and No. 242 were before 1787 merged into a single property. At the time of the 1787 census, it was home to a total of six households. Knud Holterman, a judge, resided in the building complex with his six-year-old daughter, two male servants and two maids. Gabriel Linde (1781–1891), a retired director of the Private Royal Treasury, resided in the building with one maid. Morten Thrane Brünnich, a professor at the University of Copenhagen, resided in the building with his wife Wibecke Schou, their seven children (aged one to 11), a male servant and four maids. Friderich Ehlers, a caretaker (pedel) at the university, was also among the residents of the building. Johanne Marie Pontepican, a 65-year-old widow, resided in the building with two maids. Peder Stauning, a famulus at the royal Commonitet, resided in the building with one maid and two lodgers (both students).

The property was together with most of the other buildings in the area destroyed in the Copenhagen Fire of 1795.

=== 19th century ===
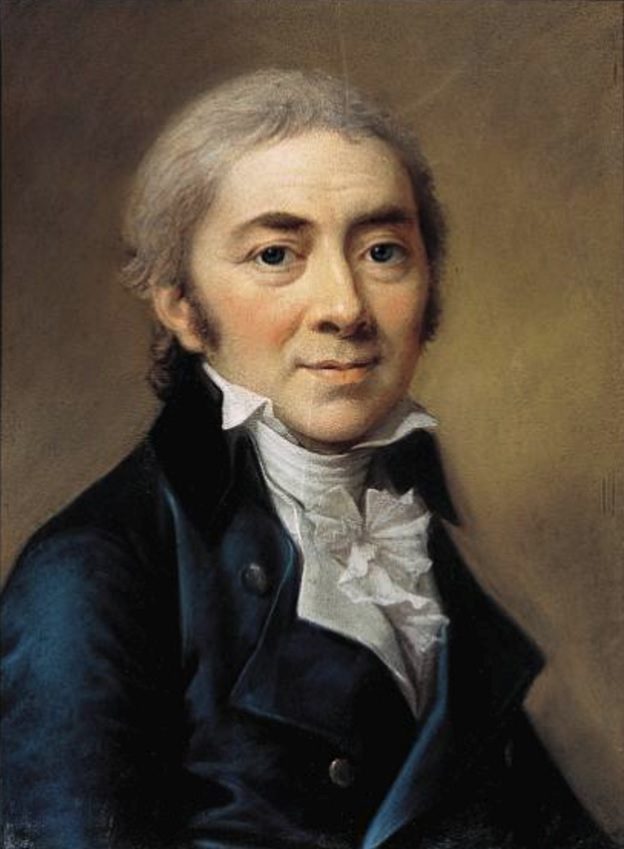
Rasmus Lange

The property was around the turn of the century owned by the lawyer and administrator Rasmus Hansen Lange. In the new cadastre of 1806, the property was listed as No 251. Lange had also been responsible for the construction of the building around the corner at Skindergade 44 (then No. 2) as well as the property Kompagnistræde 9 and was by 1806 still the owner of this property.

During the British bombardment of Copenhagen in 1807, Lange's building was again destroyed.

The current building on the site was constructed in 1811 for distiller J. Petersen. A distillery was until 1837 operated in the building. In 1862, its ground floor was adapted for use as a retail space.

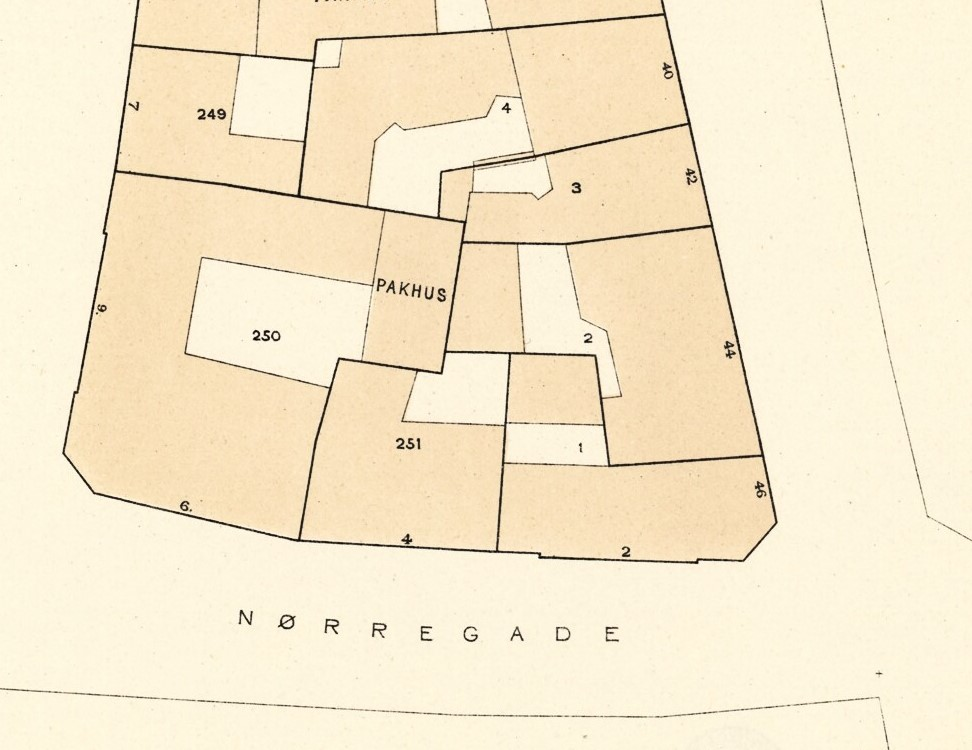
Nørregade 4 seen in a detail from one of Berggreen's block plans of Klædebo Quarter, 1886–88

At the time of the 1860 census, No. 251 was home to a total of 23 people. Poul Risberg, a galoshes maker, resided on the ground floor with his wife Cicilie f. Jensen. Christian Carl Ludvig Clausen, a high-ranking civil servant in the Ministry of Defence, resided on the third floor with his Adolphine Angelica Clausen (née Lundt) and one maid. Jacob Lackman, a merchant (grosserer), resided on the second floor with his wife Frederikke Kalkar and one maid. Margrete Rasmus, widow of a county manager in Nykøbing, resided on the first floor with her daughter Barbara Rasmus and one maid. Carl Knippel, a building painter, resided in the garret with his wife Wilhelmine Jessen, their 27-year-old son, three foster children (aged four to 14) and one maid. Søren Madsen, the proprietor of a tavern in the basement, resided in the associated dwelling with his wife Magdalene Hermansen, their two children (aged two and three) and one maid.

=== 20th century ===
The building was in 1984 acquired by bookseller Kirsten Saro. She was for many years involved in the employees-owned bookshop Atheneum in the adjacent building Nørregade 7.

== Architecture ==
Mørregade 4 is constructed with four storeys over a walk-out basement. The building owes its current appearance to a major renovation in 1952, which saw the removal of a gateway as well as gabled wall dormer. The ground floor of the building is below a belt course finished with shadow joints and painted in a dark grey colour. It features a main entrance topped by a transom window with the house number and four tall, narrow shop windows. The upper part of the facade is painted in a pale yellow colour, contrasted by the white-painted window frames and a white-painted cornice. The mansard roof is clad in red tile and features three dormer windows towards the street. A two-bay side wing extends from the rear side of the building.

== Today ==
The building contains a shop in the ground floor and a mixture of residential apartments and office space on the upper floors.
