= Wilhelm Topps Minde =

House in Denmark

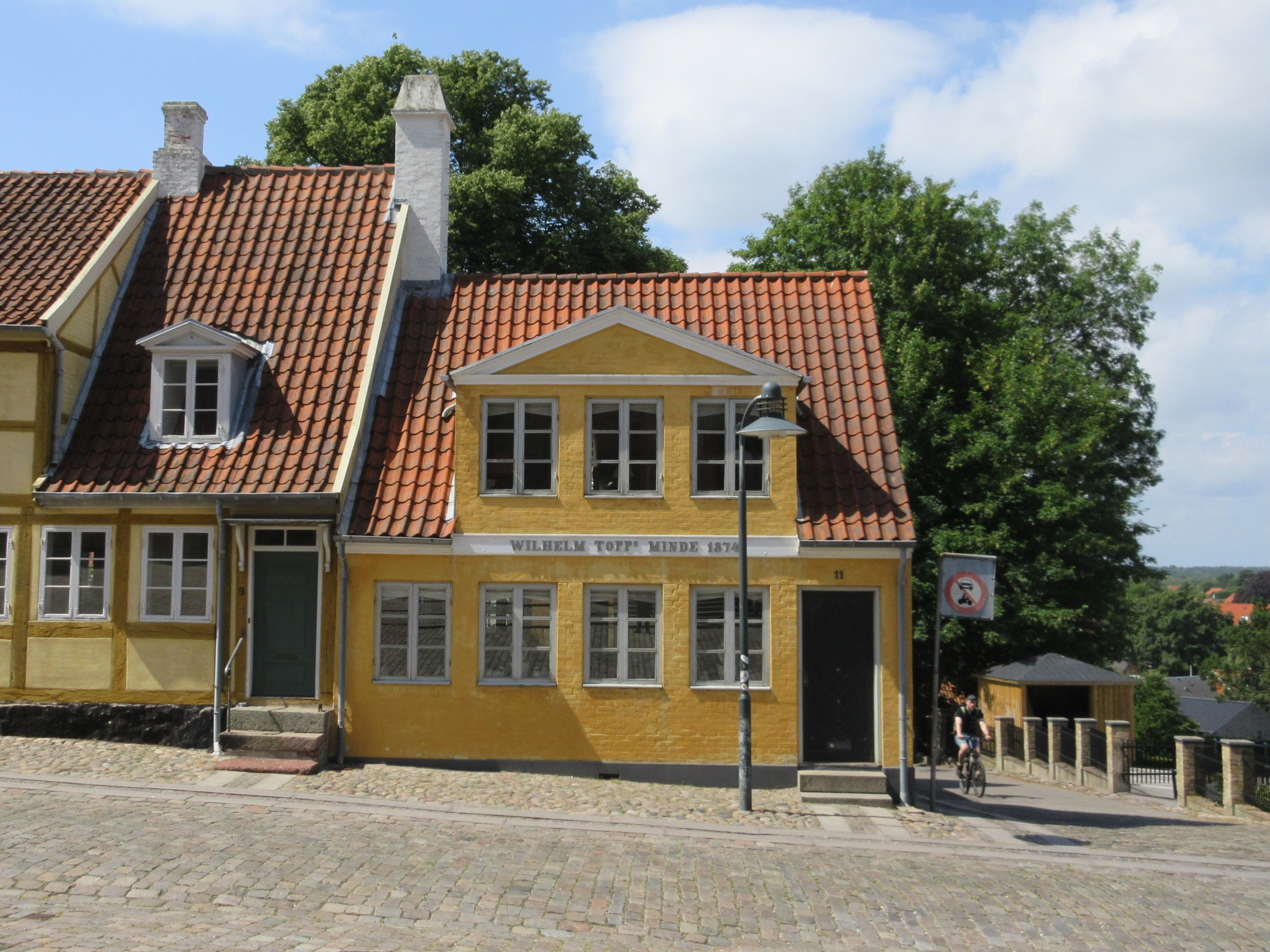
- Interactive map of the Wilhelm Topps Minde area

General information
- Location: Roskilde, Denmark
- Coordinates: 55°38′34.91″N 12°4′45.59″E
- Completed: 1718

Wilhelm Topps Minde, formerly Den Langeske Stiftelse is a small neoclassical residential building situated at the corner of Skolegade (No. 11) and Weysegangen, opposite the apse of Roskilde Cathedral, in Roskilde, Denmark. It was listed in the Danish registry of protected buildings and places in 1980.

== History ==
=== Den Langeske Stiftelse ===
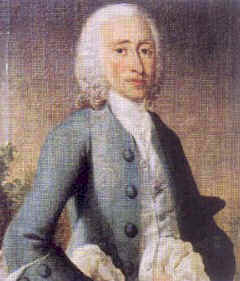
Hans Rasmussen Lange

The building was constructed in 1718 as Den Langerske Stiftelse with two dwellings for indigent relatives of the local merchant Hans Rasmussen Lange (1670–1750) and his wife Anna Margrethe von Essen. Lange ran his trading business from his home on Bryggergården at Algade 15. From 1711–1714, he served as councilman in Roskilde. From 1718–1719, he served as Consumpstionsforpagter and kongelig stempelpapirsforvalter in Roskilde. In 1713, Lange was also mentioned as the owner of a property in the street Bondetinget.

Lange's eldest son, Rasmus Hansen Lange (1699–1738) settled in Frederikssund in 1719. He was active as a merchant as well as a dyer and started a ferry service to Hornsherred. He died in 1738, 12 years before his father. His son, Hans Rasmussen Lange (1728–1798), who continued his father's dyeing business, managed Den Langeske Stiftelse from 1756–1798. From 1767 to 1772, he was the owner of Sandviggaard at Hillerød. His business activities in Frederikssund were continued by his son Jørgen Hansen Lange. Another son was the prominent Copenhagen-based lawyer Rasmus Hansen Lange. The last manager of Den Langeske Stiftelse was Hans Rasmus Lange (1837–1897). He continued the family's trading business in Frederikssund and was a member of the Frederikssund Town Council.

=== Wilhelm Topp ===
In 1874, Den Langeske Stiftelse was sold to the Copenhagen-based merchant (hørkræmmer) Wilhelm Christian Topp, whose wife was originally from Roskilde. Topp made the house available to his wife's sister, Marie Therese Elisabeth Rasmussen. Upon her brother-in-law's death, in 1883 she installed a sign with the name "Wilhelm Topps Minde 1874". The property was later acquired by Weber, who already owned the adjacent Weber House.

=== Later history ===
In 1940, it was acquired by the cathedral from one of Weber's descendants to eliminate the risk of modern, taller structures within its immediate vicinity. From 1967, Wilhelm Topps Minde was left empty for several years. A renovation of the building was completed in 1975.

In 1980, Wilhelm Topps Minde was listed in the Danish registry of protected buildings and places.

== Architecture ==
Wilhelm Tops Minde is a typical example of 18th century Danish market town architecture. The building is just five bays wide and has a three-bay, two-storey avant-corps. The roof is clad with red tile.
