= Maglekilde =

Building in Denmark

Coordinates: 55°38′34″N 12°04′37″E

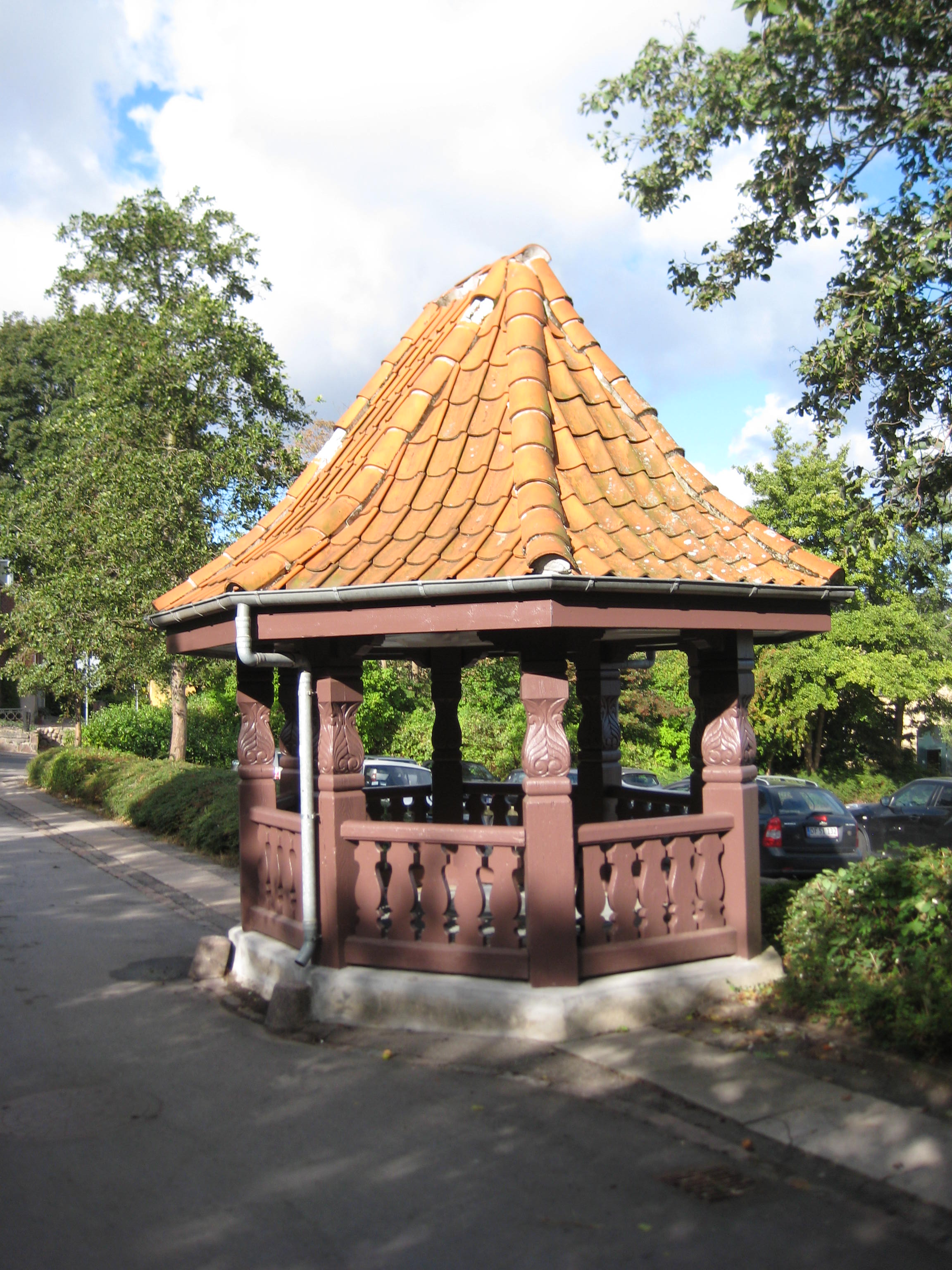
Maglekilde

Maglekilde is the most powerful of several natural springs in Roskilde, Denmark. It formerly issued water at a rate of some 90,000 litres per hour but has now dropped to 15,000 litres per hour. A wellhouse was built over the spring in 1927. The building was listed in the Danish registry of protected buildings and places in 1979.

== History ==
=== Early history ===
Extensive deposits of travertine from Maglekilde were mined and used as a building material before bricks became readily available. Several churches in the Roskilde area were built in travertine from the spring in the 11th and 12th centuries. This activity resulted in the formation of a pond which was used as a mill pond. The watermill at the site was called Maglekilde Watermill (Maglekilde Mølle). The water from the spring also powered five other watermills on its way to Roskilde Fjord: Vandhulsmølle, Sankt Mortens Mølle, Kapelsmøllen, Sankt Clara Mølle and Strandmøllen. Maglekilde Watermill is first mentioned by name in 1258 but it most likely included in the prebend of one of the canons at the cathedral chapter in 1253.

=== Maglekilde Paper and Textile Mill ===
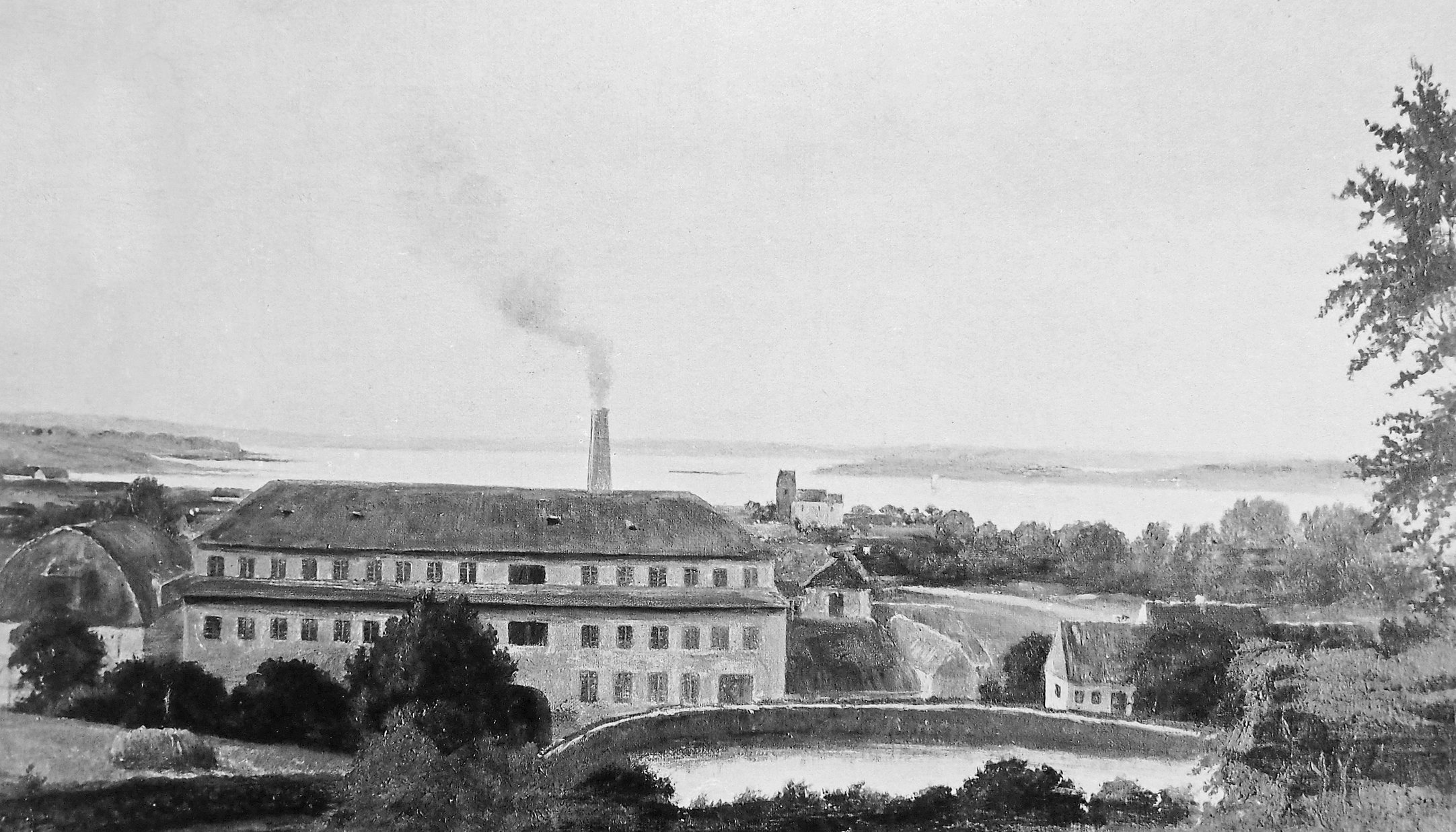
Maglekilde Mill seen on a print from after 1820.

On 8 April 1731, Maglekilde Watermill was the first of the buildings which were destroyed in the series of devastating fires that hit Roskilde in 1731. A new paper mill was built on the site in 1737 and it was joined by a textile mill in 1761.

The complex was in 1810 acquired by five Jewish industrialists from Copenhagen. They introduced a number of new initiatives, including the construction of workers' housing and the import of skilled stockings weavers from Magdeburg. The father of O.H.Schmeltz, who would become known for his many large donations to the city of Roskilde, was employed as a master weaver at Maglekilde Textile Mill in 1811.

In 1820, Maglekilde Paper Mill installed the fourth steam engine in the country. In spite of the introduction of new technology, Maglekilde Paper Mill was unable to compete with the larger paper mill Strandmøllen on Mølleåen and in 1838 the factory went bankrupt.

=== Maglekilde Spa and later history ===
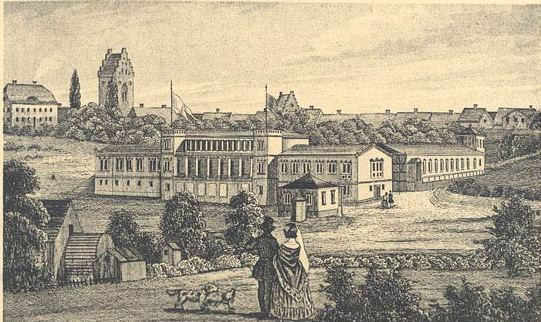
Maglekilde Spa in 1847

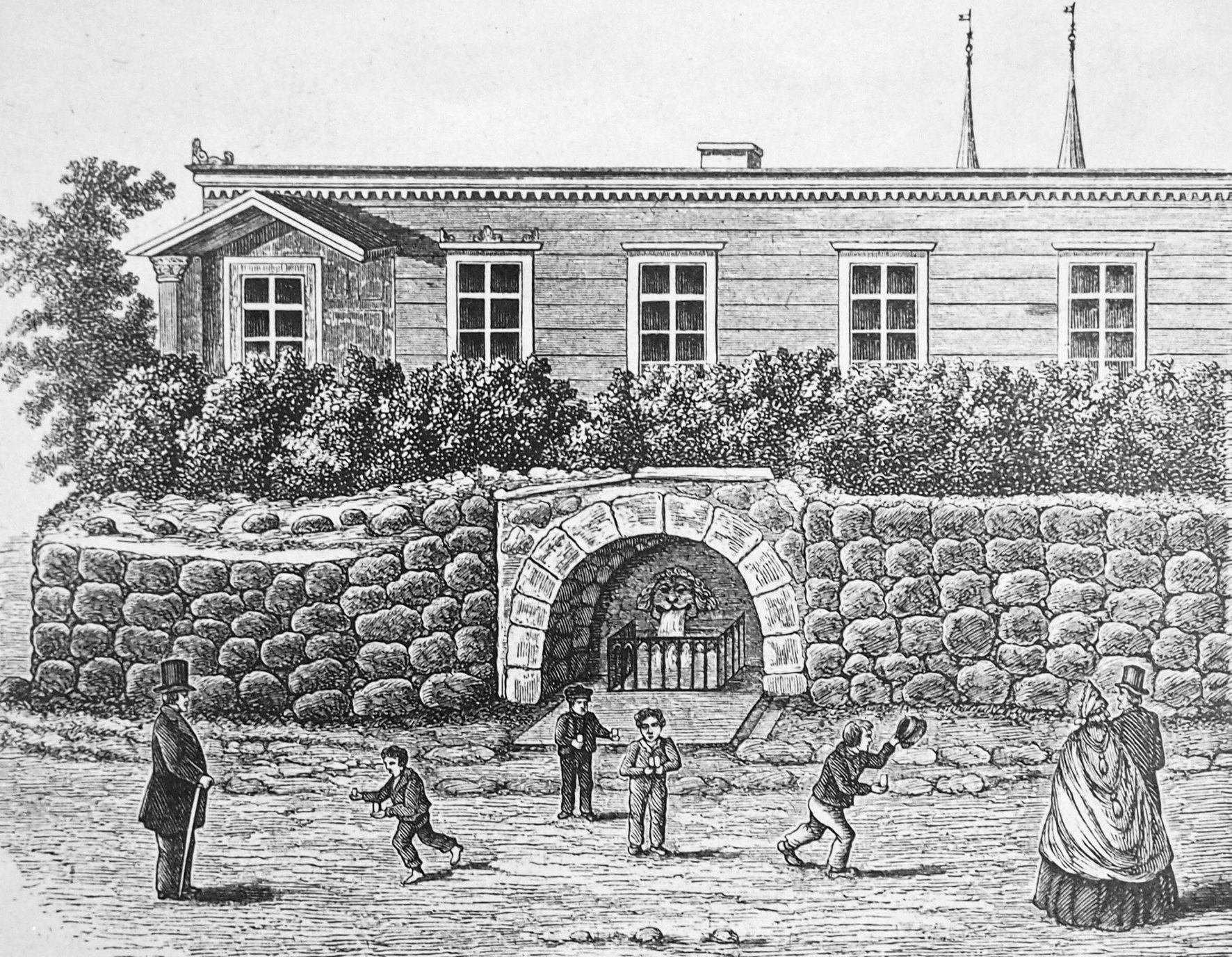
The grotto

The disused industrial complex was acquired by a group of citizens from Roskilde in 1846. They demolished the buildings, filled the mill pond and built a combined spa and mineral water factory on the site. The complex was designed by the architect Hans Conrad Stilling. The water was directed through a closed ditch to a grotto on Maglekildevej where it sprang from the mouth of a Neptune figure. A small wellhouse was built over the spring in 1927. The spa building was used for other purposes prior to its demolition in 1972.

Never gaining popularity, Maglekilde Spa (Maglekilde Vandkuranstalt) attracted only few guests and closed after just two years in 1851. The complex was in 1851 acquired by Constant Dirckink-Holmfeld, a German-born civil servant and political writer, who had fallen out of favour in Copenhagen for his criticism of the March Revolution and new constitution. He lived in part of the complex while the rest was still used by the mineral water factory or rented out to private tenants. He moved to Hamburg in the early 1750s.

Maglekilde Machine Factory opened at the site in 1865.

== Today ==
The wellhouse is a small timber structure with a red tile roof. It is today located on a parking lot. The wellhouse was listed in 1979.

== See also ==
- Listed buildings in Roskilde Municipality
