= Meyercrones Stiftelse =

Building in Roskilde, Denmark

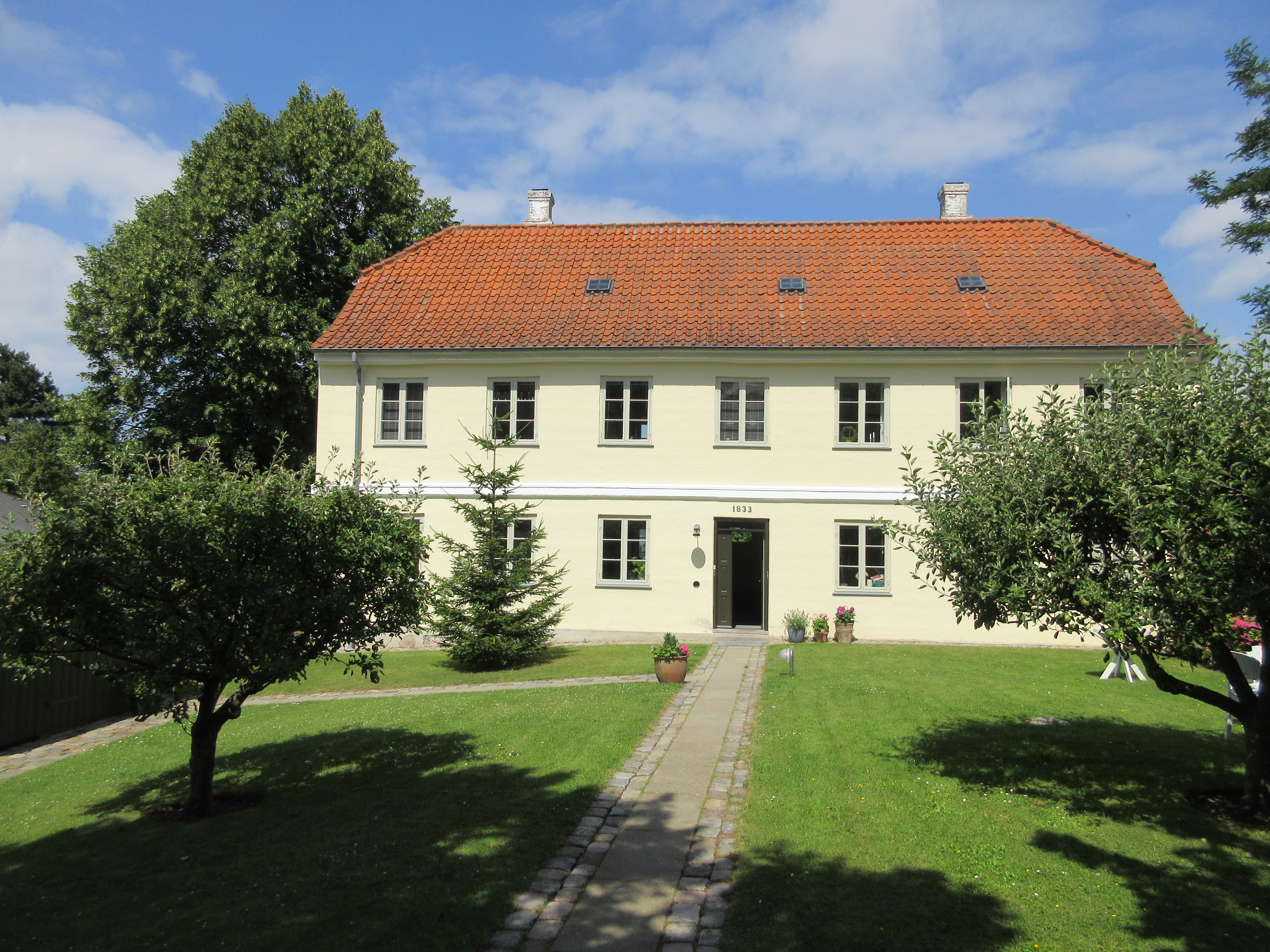
- Meyercrones Stiftelse
- Interactive map of the Meyercrones Stiftelse area

General information
- Architectural style: Late Neoclassical
- Location: Roskilde, Denmark
- Coordinates: 55°38′36.08″N 12°4′48.71″E
- Completed: 1833
- Owner: Roskilde Domsogns Menighedsråd

Meyercrones Stiftelse is a historic building located just north of Roskilde Cathedral in central Roskilde, Denmark. It was listed on the Danish registry of protected buildings and places by the Danish Heritage Agency on 15 February 1978.

== History ==
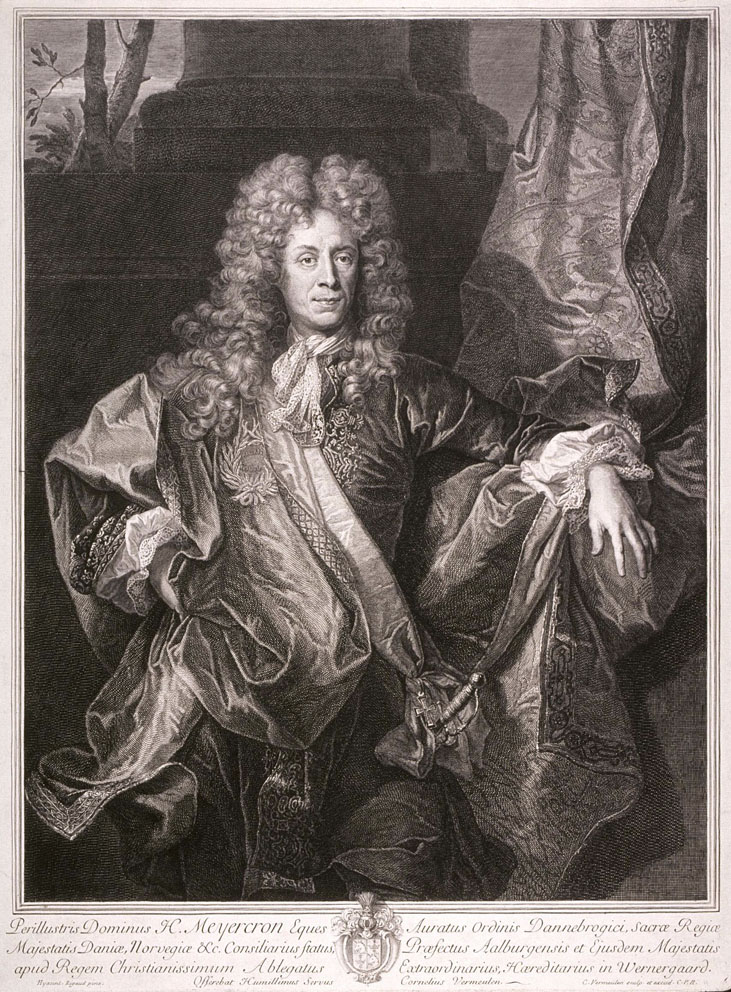
Henning Meyercrone painted by Hyacinthe Rigaud in 1794

Meyercrones Stiftelse was founded by the widow after Henning de Meyercrone. He had served as Danish envoy in France until 1706. His widow, Christiane Meyercrone, was a daughter of Roskilde mayor Herman Schrøder. When her husband died, she bought a property with a small house located just north of Roskilde Cathedral from her mother Eva Schrøder. Known as Kantorhaven (The Cantor's Garden), it had previously been the site of a residence for the cantor at the cathedral. The house, which dated from the beginning of the 18th century, was converted into two residences for needy widows of the middle class. Christiane Meyercrone managed the property until her death in 1738 and founded Meyercrones Stiftelse in her testament. Her niece, a daughter of Henning Meyercrone's brother Bent Meyer and Christine Meyercrone's sister Maria Schrøder, became the new manager of the foundation. and arranged for its charter to be written in 1830.

The small building from the beginning of the 18th century was replaced by a larger building in 1933. Meyercrones Stiftelse was later merged with Duebrødre Kloster. The old building was replaced by a new and larger one with four apartments in 1832.

== Architecture ==
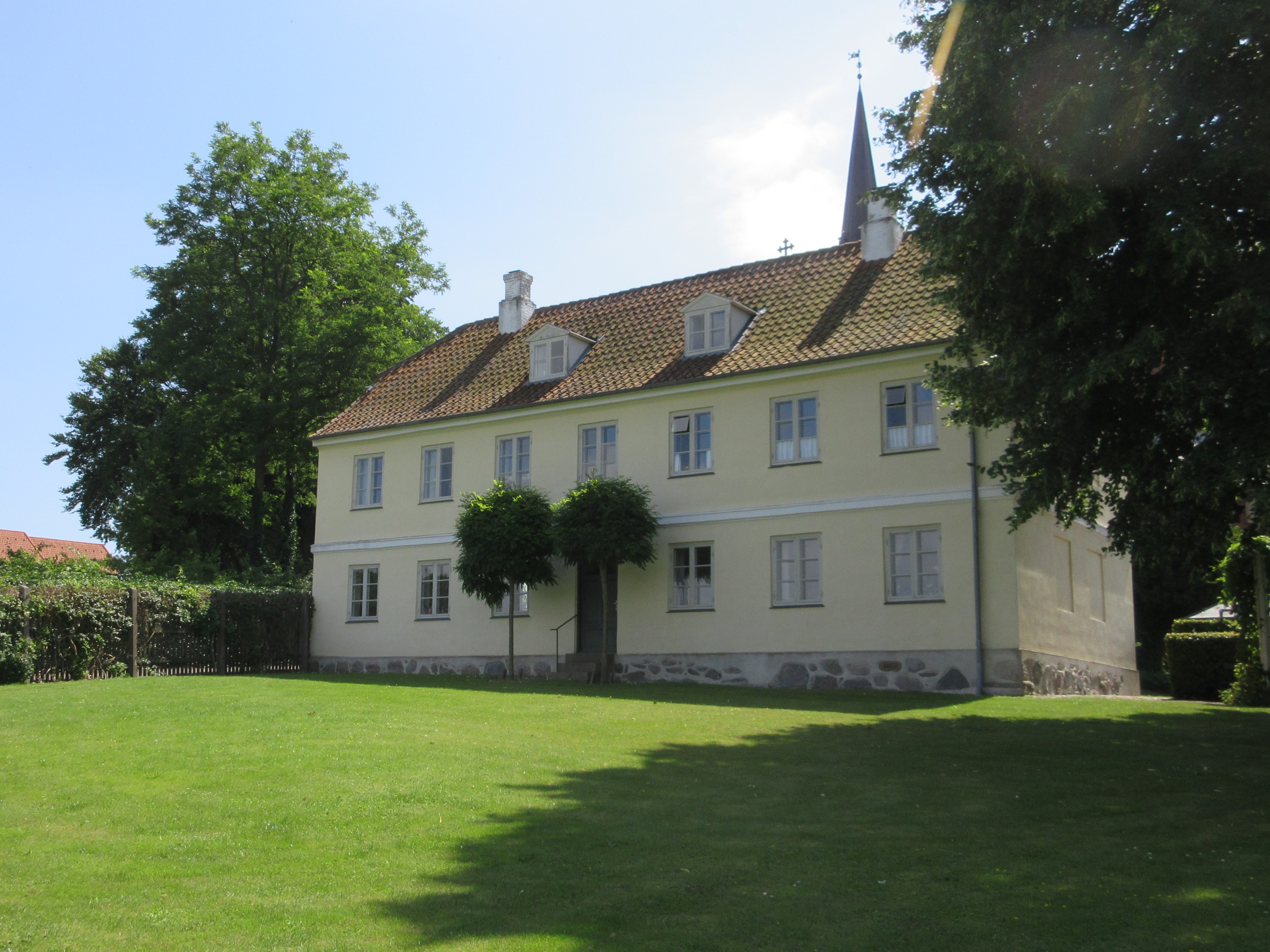
The building seen from the garden

The building is designed in the Late Neoclassical style. It is a two-story building with a half-hipped red tile roof. The garden is bounded by brick walls along Domkirkepladsen and Regensstien to the east. A low stone wall runs along Domprovstestræde to the rear of the building.

== Today ==
The building was acquired by Roskilde Domsogns Menighedsråd in 1991.
