= Listed buildings in Kerteminde Municipality =

This is a list of listed buildings in Kerteminde Municipality, Denmark.

== The list ==
=== 5290 Marslev ===
Listing name	Image	Location	Coordinates	Description
Klarskov		Sarumgårdsvej 4A, 5290 Marslev		
Klarskov		Sarumgårdsvej 4A, 5290 Marslev		
Klarskov		Sarumgårdsvej 4A, 5290 Marslev		
Klarskov		Sarumgårdsvej 4A, 5290 Marslev		
Klarskov		Sarumgårdsvej 4A, 5290 Marslev		
Selleberg		Kertemindevejen 23A, 5290 Marslev		

=== 5300 Kerteminde ===
Listing name	Image	Location	Coordinates	Description
Andresen House		Andresens Købmandsgård 2, 5300 Kerteminde		
Andresen House		Langegade 5, 5300 Kerteminde		
Andresen House		Langegade 7, 5300 Kerteminde		
Andresen House		Langegade 7, 5300 Kerteminde		
Munk House		Muusgården 1, 5300 Kerteminde		
Munk House		Muusgården 22, 5300 Kerteminde		
Hverringe		Hverringevej 206, 5300 Kerteminde		
Kerteminde Museum/Farvergården		Langegade 8, 5300 Kerteminde		
Kølstrup Præstegård		Muusgården 1, 5300 Kerteminde		
Kølstrup Præstegård		Muusgården 1, 5300 Kerteminde		
Kølstrup Præstegård		Muusgården 1, 5300 Kerteminde		
Kølstrup Præstegård		Muusgården 1, 5300 Kerteminde		
Kølstrup Præstegård		Muusgården 1, 5300 Kerteminde		
Kølstrup Præstegård		Muusgården 1, 5300 Kerteminde		
Langegade 12		Langegade 12, 5300 Kerteminde		
Langegade 12		Strandgade 9, 5300 Kerteminde		
Lundsgård		Lundsgårdsvej 6, 5300 Kerteminde		
Målegården		Måle Bygade 23, 5300 Kerteminde		
Målegården		Måle Bygade 23, 5300 Kerteminde		
Målegården		Måle Bygade 23, 5300 Kerteminde		
Revninge Hospital		Revninge Bygade 119, 5300 Kerteminde		
Svanemøllen		Møllebakken 9, 5300 Kerteminde		
Toldboden		Strandgade 3, 5300 Kerteminde		
Ulriksholm		Ulriksholmvej 96, 5300 Kerteminde		
Vestergade 12 A		Vestergade 12, 5300 Kerteminde		

=== 5370 Mesinge ===
Listing name	Image	Location	Coordinates	Description
Johannes Poulsen House		Viby Bygade 13, 5370 Mesinge		
Johannes Poulsen House		Viby Bygade 13, 5370 Mesinge		
Johannes Poulsen House		Viby Bygade 13, 5370 Mesinge		
Johannes Poulsen House		Viby Bygade 13, 5370 Mesinge		
Mesinge Kirkelade		Mesinge Bygade 57, 5370 Mesinge		
Sognefogedgården		Viby Bygade 12, 5370 Mesinge		
Sognefogedgården		Viby Bygade 12, 5370 Mesinge		
Viby Bygade 16		Viby Bygade 16, 5370 Mesinge		
Viby Bygade 16		Viby Bygade 16, 5370 Mesinge		
Viby Bygade 16		Viby Bygade 16, 5370 Mesinge		
Viby Bygade 16		Viby Bygade 16, 5370 Mesinge		
Viby Hospital		Viby Bygade 21, 5370 Mesinge		
Viby Mølle		Rødsbækvej 36, 5370 Mesinge		

=== 5380 Dalby ===
Listing name	Image	Location	Coordinates	Description
Dalby Præstegård		Fynshovedvej 322, 5380 Dalby		

=== 5390 Martofte ===
Listing name	Image	Location	Coordinates	Description
Bogensøgård		Bogensøvej 306, 5390 Martofte		
Bogensøgård		Bogensøvej 306, 5390 Martofte		
Bøgebjerg		Bøgebjergvej 445, 5390 Martofte		
Bøgebjerg		Bøgebjergvej 445, 5390 Martofte		
Scheelenborg		Fynshovedvej 417, 5390 Martofte		
Scheelenborg		Fynshovedvej 417, 5390 Martofte		

=== 5540 Ullerslev ===
Listing name	Image	Location	Coordinates	Description
Rønninge Søgård		Søgårdsvej 10, 5540 Ullerslev		
Rønninge Søgård		Søgårdsvej 10, 5540 Ullerslev		
Skovsbo		Skovsbovej 155, 5540 Ullerslev		

=== 5550 Langeskov ===
Listing name	Image	Location	Coordinates	Description
Rønninge Bygade 26		Rønninge Bygade 26, 5550 Langeskov		
