= Listed buildings in Ærø Municipality =

This is a list of listed buildings in Ærø Municipality, Denmark.

== The list ==
=== 5970 Ærøskøbing ===
Listing name	Image	Location	Coordinates	Description
Ærøskøbing Pharmacy		Vestergade 44, 5970 Ærøskøbing		
Ærøskøbing Pharmacy		Vestergade 44, 5970 Ærøskøbing		
Brogade 3-5		Brogade 5, 5970 Ærøskøbing		
Brogade 20		Brogade 20, 5970 Ærøskøbing		
Brogade 21		Brogade 21, 5970 Ærøskøbing		
Brogade 28		Brogade 28, 5970 Ærøskøbing		
Gyden 20		Gyden 20, 5970 Ærøskøbing		
Hammerich House		Gyden 22, 5970 Ærøskøbing		
Kammerrådgård		Borgnæsvej 16, 5970 Ærøskøbing		
Kammerrådgård		Borgnæsvej 16, 5970 Ærøskøbing		
Kammerrådgård		Borgnæsvej 16, 5970 Ærøskøbing		
Kammerrådgård		Borgnæsvej 16, 5970 Ærøskøbing		
Koch House and Drejøe House		Nørregade 41, 5970 Ærøskøbing		
Kogehuset		Ærøskøbing Havn 1, 5970 Ærøskøbing		
Nørregade 1		Nørregade 1, 5970 Ærøskøbing		
Nørregade 13		Nørregade 13, 5970 Ærøskøbing		
Nørregade 47		Nørregade 47, 5970 Ærøskøbing		
Philip Kock House		Søndergade 36, 5970 Ærøskøbing		
Postbygningen		Vestergade 29, 5970 Ærøskøbing		
Prior House		Søndergade 32, 5970 Ærøskøbing		
R. Knudsen Clausens Fattigstiftelse		Smedegade 22, 5970 Ærøskøbing		
Rise Kirkelade		St. Rise Landevej 9, 5970 Ærøskøbing		
Risemarksvej 8		Risemarksvej 8, 5970 Ærøskøbing		
Risemarksvej 8		Risemarksvej 8, 5970 Ærøskøbing		
Smedegade 29		Smedegade 29, 5970 Ærøskøbing		
Smedegade 37		Smedegade 37, 5970 Ærøskøbing		
Stensagergård		Gydeagre 2, 5970 Ærøskøbing		
Søndergade 4		Søndergade 4, 5970 Ærøskøbing		
Søndergade 9		Søndergade 9, 5970 Ærøskøbing		
Søndergade 18		Søndergade 18, 5970 Ærøskøbing		
Søndergade 42		Søndergade 42A, 5970 Ærøskøbing		
Søndergade 55		Søndergade 55, 5970 Ærøskøbing		
Søndergade 57		Søndergade 57, 5970 Ærøskøbing		
Vestergade 5		Vestergade 5, 5970 Ærøskøbing		
Vestergade 16		Vestergade 17, 5970 Ærøskøbing		
Vestergade 18		Vestergade 18, 5970 Ærøskøbing		
Vestergade 22		Vestergade 22, 5970 Ærøskøbing		
Vestergade 23		Vestergade 23, 5970 Ærøskøbing		
Vestergade 28		Vestergade 28, 5970 Ærøskøbing		
Vestergade 30		Vestergade 30, 5970 Ærøskøbing		
Vestergade 41 A-C		Vestergade 41A, 5970 Ærøskøbing		
Vestergade 41 A-C		Vestergade 41A, 5970 Ærøskøbing		
Visdommens Kilde, Den Kgl. Danske Skole		Torvet 9, 5970 Ærøskøbing		
Zahrtmann House		Gyden 16, 5970 Ærøskøbing		
Ærøskøbing Bymølle, Lille Mølle		Tivoli 4B, 5970 Ærøskøbing		
Østergade 9		Østergade 9, 5970 Ærøskøbing		

=== 5985 Søby Ærø ===
Listing name	Image	Location	Coordinates	Description
Søbygård		Søbygårdsvej 2, 5985 Søby Ærø		
Søbygård		Søbygårdsvej 2, 5985 Søby Ærø		
Søbygård		Søbygårdsvej 2, 5985 Søby Ærø		
Søbygård		Søbygårdsvej 2, 5985 Søby Ærø		
Søbygård		Søbygårdsvej 2, 5985 Søby Ærø		
Søbygård		Søbygårdsvej 2, 5985 Søby Ærø		
Søbygård		Søbygårdsvej 2, 5985 Søby Ærø		
Vester Mølle		Vester Møllebakke 4, 5985 Søby Ærø		
Vester Mølle		Vester Møllebakke 4, 5985 Søby Ærø		
Vester Mølle		Vester Møllebakke 4, 5985 Søby Ærø		
Vitsø Nor Pumpemølle		Vitsø 33, 5985 Søby Ærø		

== Delisted buildings ==
Listing name	Image	Location	Coordinates	Description
Gyden 14		Gyden 14, 5970 Ærøskøbing		Church
Søndergade 2		Søndergade 2, 5970 Ærøskøbing		
Vestergade 32		Vestergade 32, 5970 Ærøskøbing		
Vestergade 47-49		Vestergade 47B, 5970 Ærøskøbing		
