= Duebrødre Kloster =

Historical building in central Roskilde, Denmark

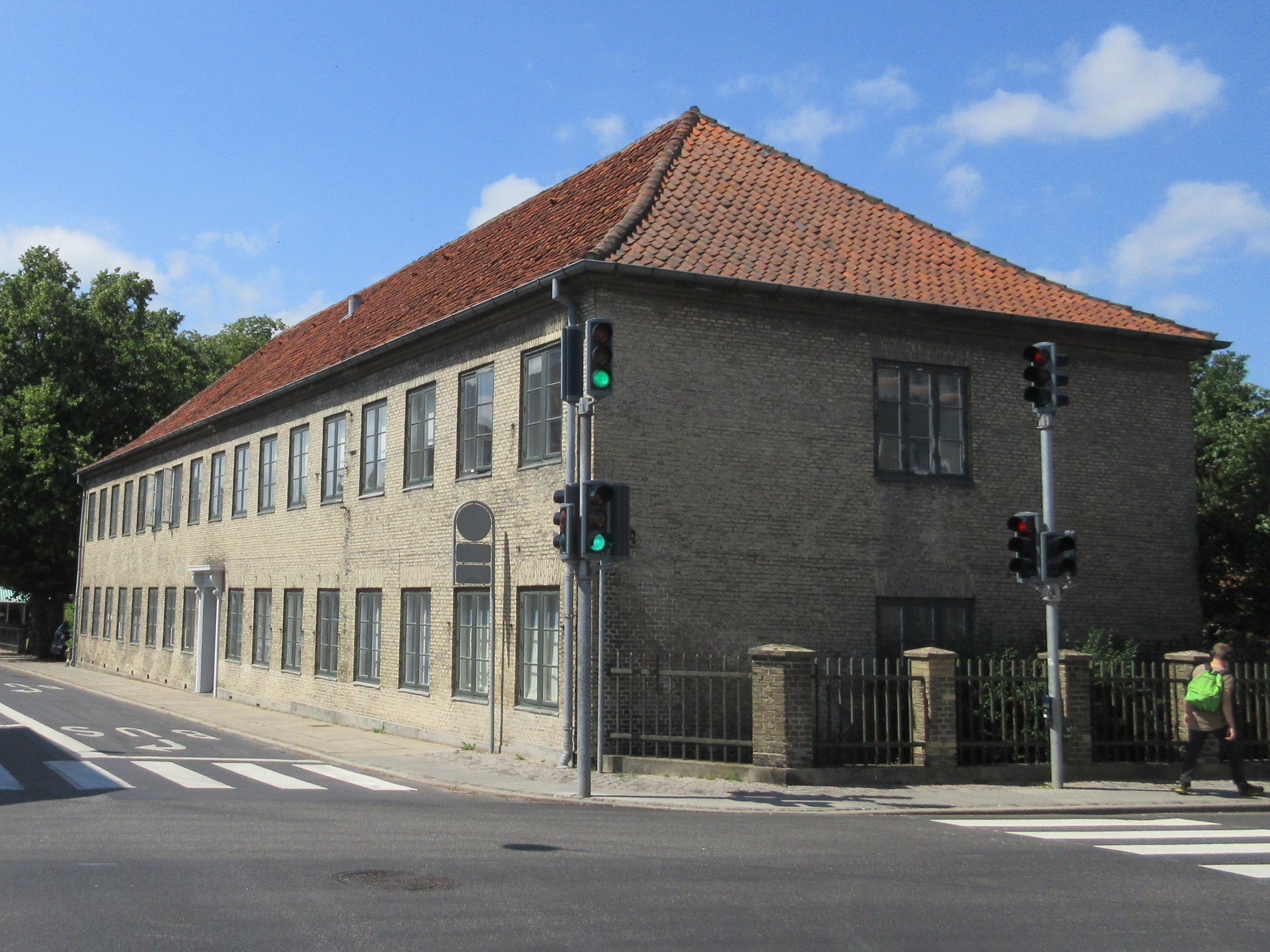
- Duebrødre kloster seen from the corner with Allehelgensgade
- Interactive map of the Duebrødre Kloster area

General information
- Architectural style: Late Neoclassical
- Location: Roskilde, Denmark
- Coordinates: 55°38′22.21″N 12°4′51.7″E
- Completed: 1841
- Owner: Roskilde Domsogns Menighedsråd

Design and construction
- Architect: Jørgen Hansen Koch

Duebrødre Kloster is a historical building located at the corner of Bredegade and Allehelgensgade in central Roskilde, Denmark. It was built in 1841 to a design by Jørgen Hansen Koch.

Duebrødre Kloster is also the name of the charitable organisation for which the building was originally constructed as a home for needy widows. It is no longer the owner of the building but is still active and owns 108 residences at three different sites in Roskilde. Duebrødre Kloster's old headquarters on Stændertorvet from 1880 was taken over by Roskilde City Hall in 1878. The city hall has now been moved to new premises.

== History ==
The Order of the Holy Ghost was active in Roskilde from the 14th century, operating hospitals and other facilities for the weak and poor. Their first building was located outside the city. It was later used as a prebend for one of the canons at Roskilde Cathedral.

After the Reformation Duebrødrene was converted into a charitable society. It was one of three charitable institutions in the city, the others being St. John's House (Sankt Jørgensgård) and the House of the Holy Ghost (Helligåndshuset). In 1570 it was decided by royal decree that the two latter should be dissolved and that their assets should be transferred to Duebrødre Kloster.

In the middle of the 17th century Duebrødre Kloster was moved into the city. Its new home was a medieval building located to the south of Roskilde Cathedral and west of Fondens Bro. This building was demolished in 1742 after a new Duebrødre Hospital had inaugurated at Stændertorvet in 1741. The building on Stændertorvet was replaced by a new building by Johan Daniel Herholdt at the same site in 1880. It became part of Roskilde Town Hall in 1967.

The building in Bredegade was built by royal master builder Jørgen Hansen Koch as a branch of the hospital in 1841. It contained housing for 12 elderly middle class women, four widows and eight spinsters.

Duebrødre Kloster was later merged with two more institutions, Søren Olsens Hospital (founded in 1600) and Meyercrones Stiftelse (founded in 1838).

== Architecture ==
Duebrødre Kloster is a two-storey brick building built to a sober, Neoclassical design. To the rear of the building is a courtyard with a washhouse and a residence for the gatekeeper.

== Today ==
Duebrødre Kloster is still active and has a total of 108 residences at three sites:

- Sct. Agnesvej – 56 units
- Provstestræde – 21 units
- Kong Valdemarsvej – 31 units
