= Roskilde Royal Mansion =

Building in Roskilde, Denmark

Roskilde Mansion
- Det Kongelige Palæ i Roskilde
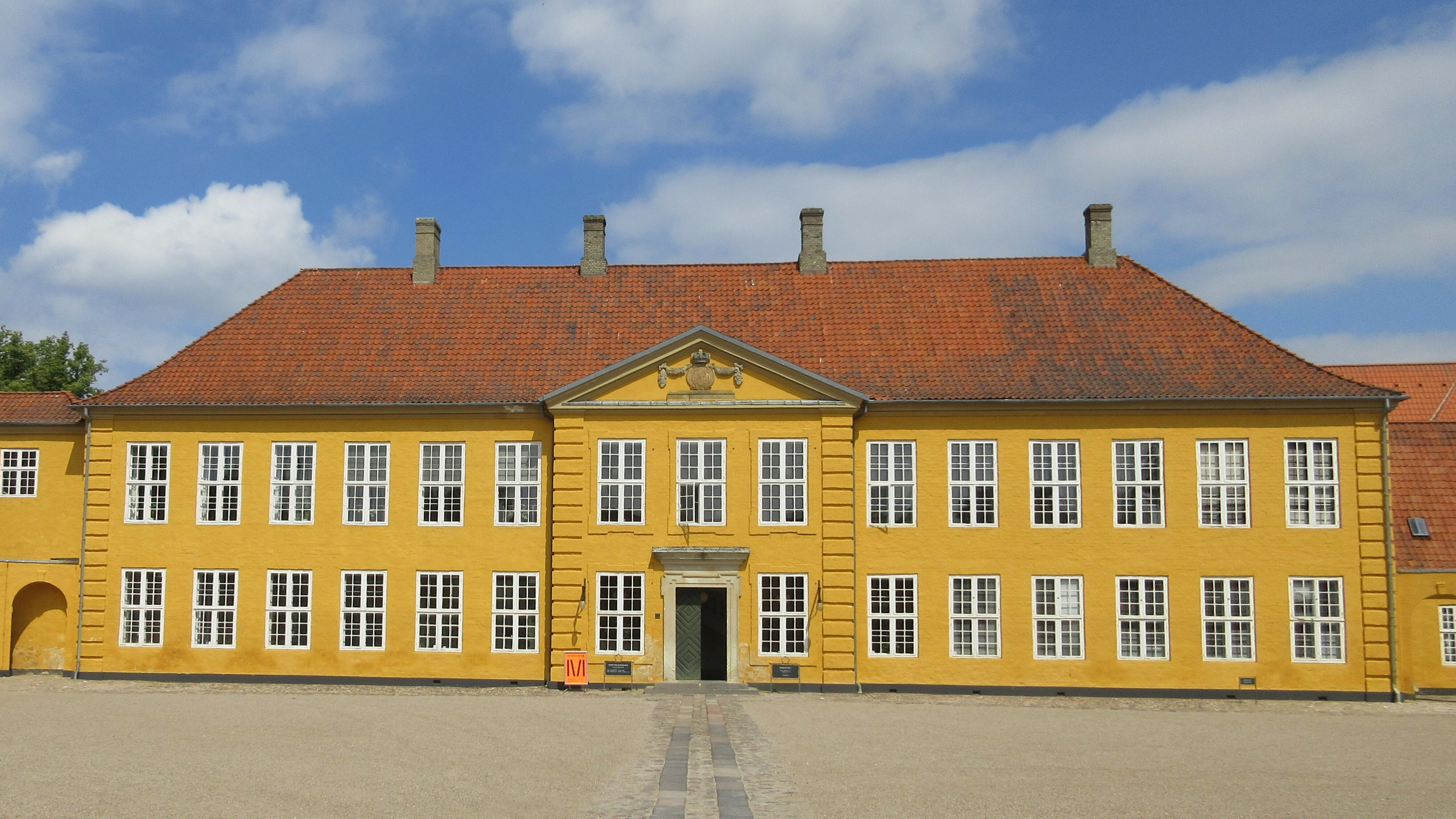
- The Palace Wing seen across the courtyard

General information
- Architectural style: Baroque
- Location: Roskilde, Denmark
- Coordinates: 55°38′32″N 12°4′54″E
- Construction started: 1733
- Completed: 1736
- Client: Christian VI

Design and construction
- Architect: Lauritz de Thurah

Roskilde Mansion (Danish: Det Gule Palæ i Roskilde), also known as Roskilde Palace and as the Yellow Mansion (Danish: Det Gule Palæ), is a former royal Baroque mansion in central Roskilde, Denmark. Located just east of Roskilde Cathedral, it now houses both an exhibition venue and the office and official residence of the Bishop of Roskilde.

== History ==
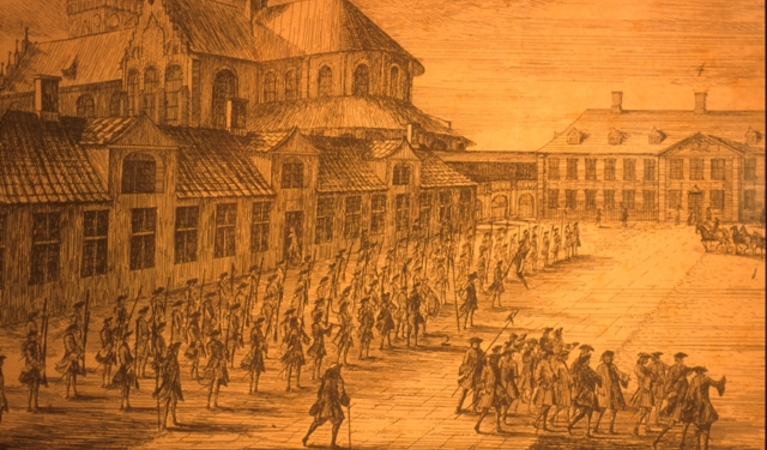
Roskilde Mansion's courtyard in the late 18th century

Roskilde Mansion replaced a bishop's palace which had stood at the site since the Middle Ages. Commissioned by King Christian VI, the new building was constructed to provide a residence for the royal family when they passed through the city or attended royal funerals and other ceremonies in Roskilde Cathedral. Lauritz de Thurah who had recently been engaged as royal master builder, was charged with its design in 1733 and the palace was completed in 1736.

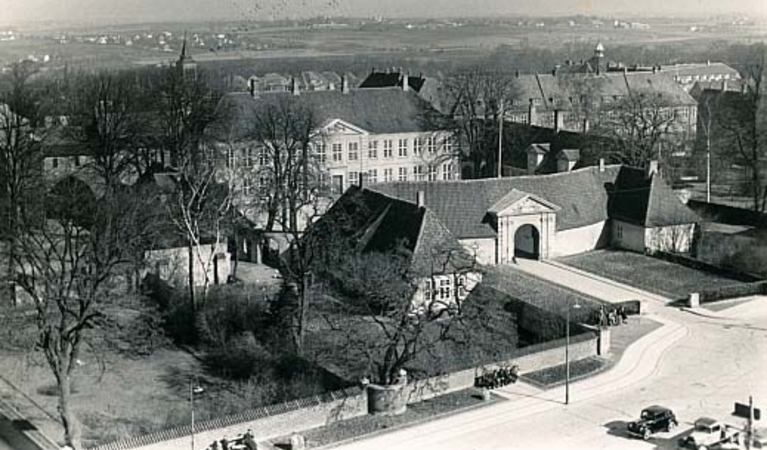
Roskilde Mansion in 1948

During the English siege of Copenhagen in 1807, the mansion served as headquarters of General Sir Arthur Wellesley, the future Duke of Wellington. Later in the century, it provided a venue for the so-called Assembly of the Estates (Danish: Stænderforsamlingerne for øerne), a key event leading up to the adoption of the Danish constitution in 1849.

== Architecture ==
Rendering by Thurah.

Built in the Baroque style, in yellow-washed masonry and with red tile roofs, the four-winged complex consists of a two-storey main wing, two one-storey lateral wings and a curved gate wing opening to the Stændertorvet. The four wings are connected by curving galleries.

Facing the courtyard, the facade of the main wing has pilasters and a median risalit tipped by a triangular pediment decorated with the royal coat of arms.

Dating from the 13th century, the Gate of Absalon which connects the mansion to the apse of Roskilde Cathedral, is the only surviving part of the former bishop's palace.

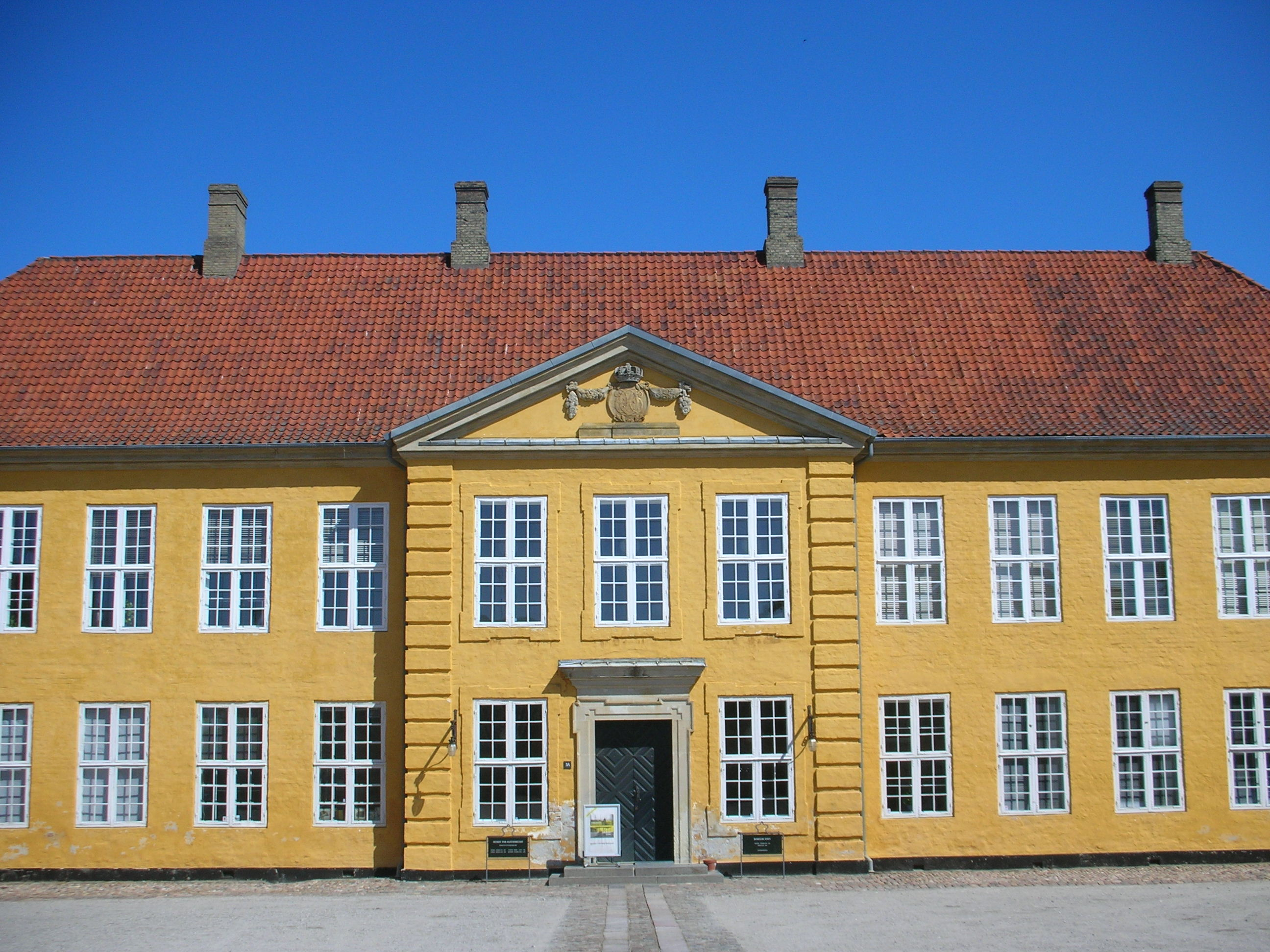
The median risalit of the Palace Wing

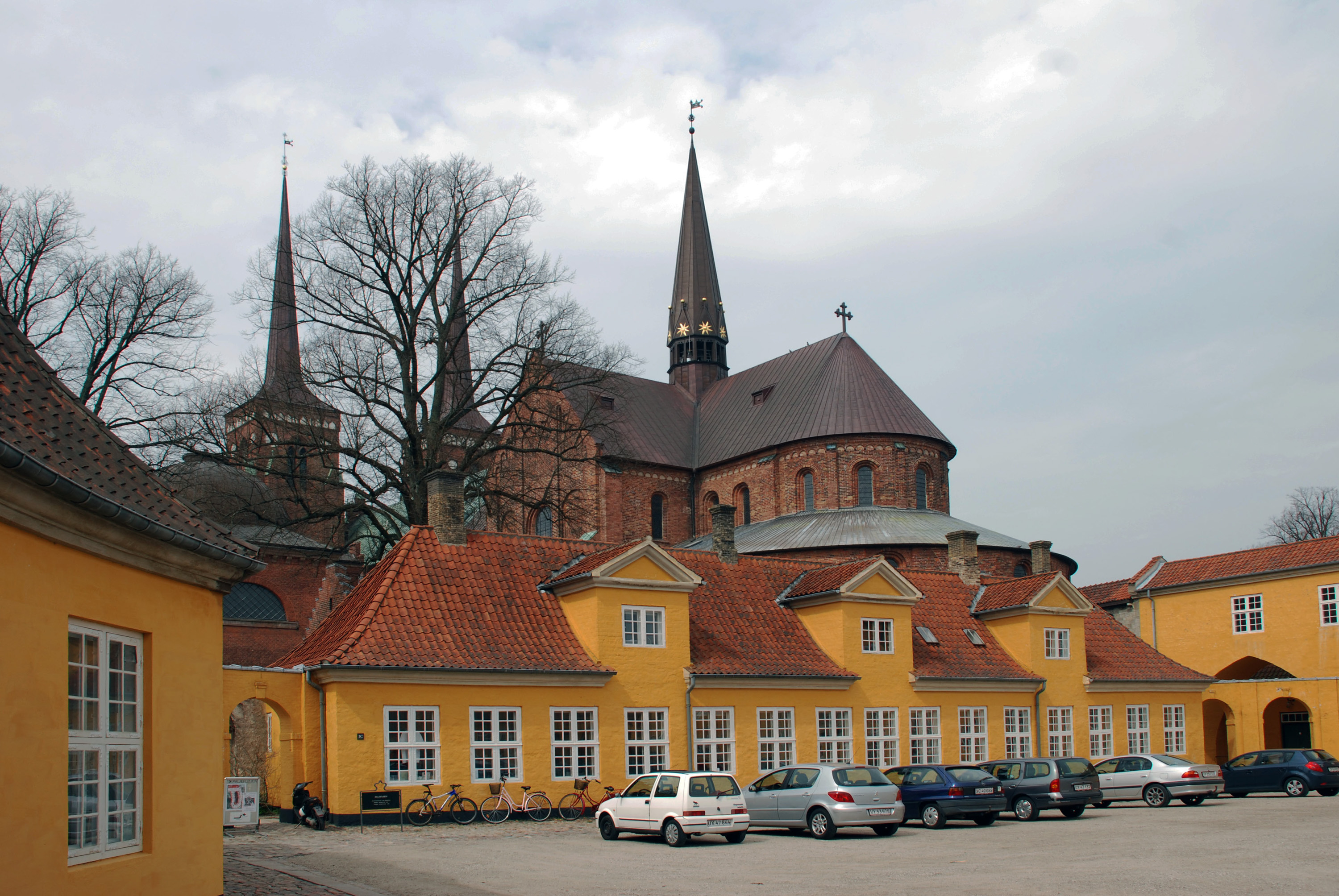
Courtyard view of one of the lateral wings

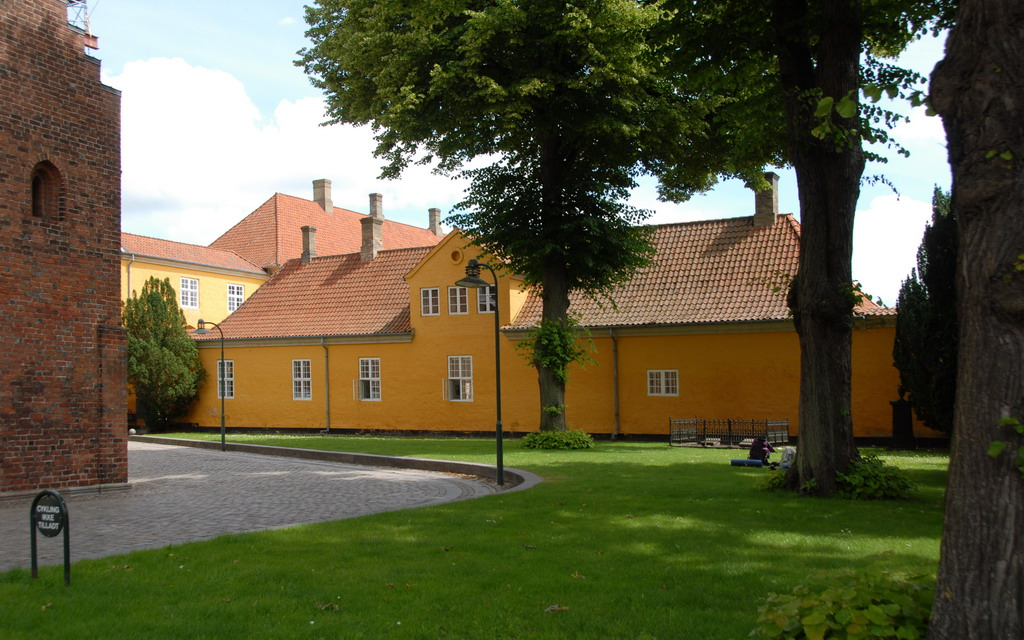
Lateral wing seen from the cathedral

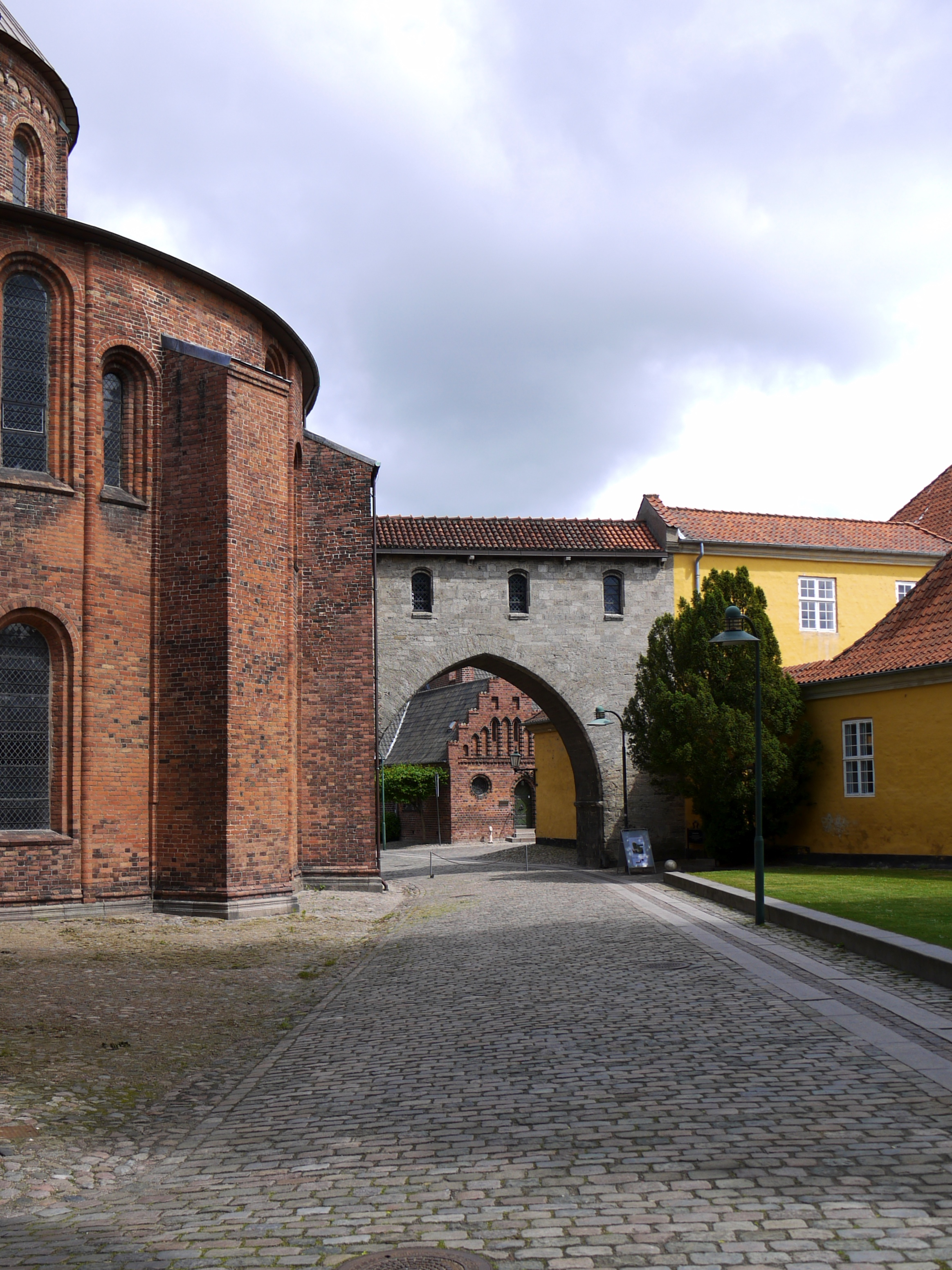
The Arch of Absalon

== Roskilde Mansion today ==
Since 1924, one of the wings has been home to the office and official residence of the Bishop of Roskilde. The rest of the complex houses Roskilde Art Association and the Palace Collections. At the end of 2021 the Museum of Contemporary Art, founded in 1991, moved out of the mansion to establish a museum without a permanent building. The mansion's gardens and courtyard are also used for exhibitions, concerts and other cultural events.

== See also ==
- Bispegården, Copenhagen
