= Skindergade 44 =

Building in Copenhagen

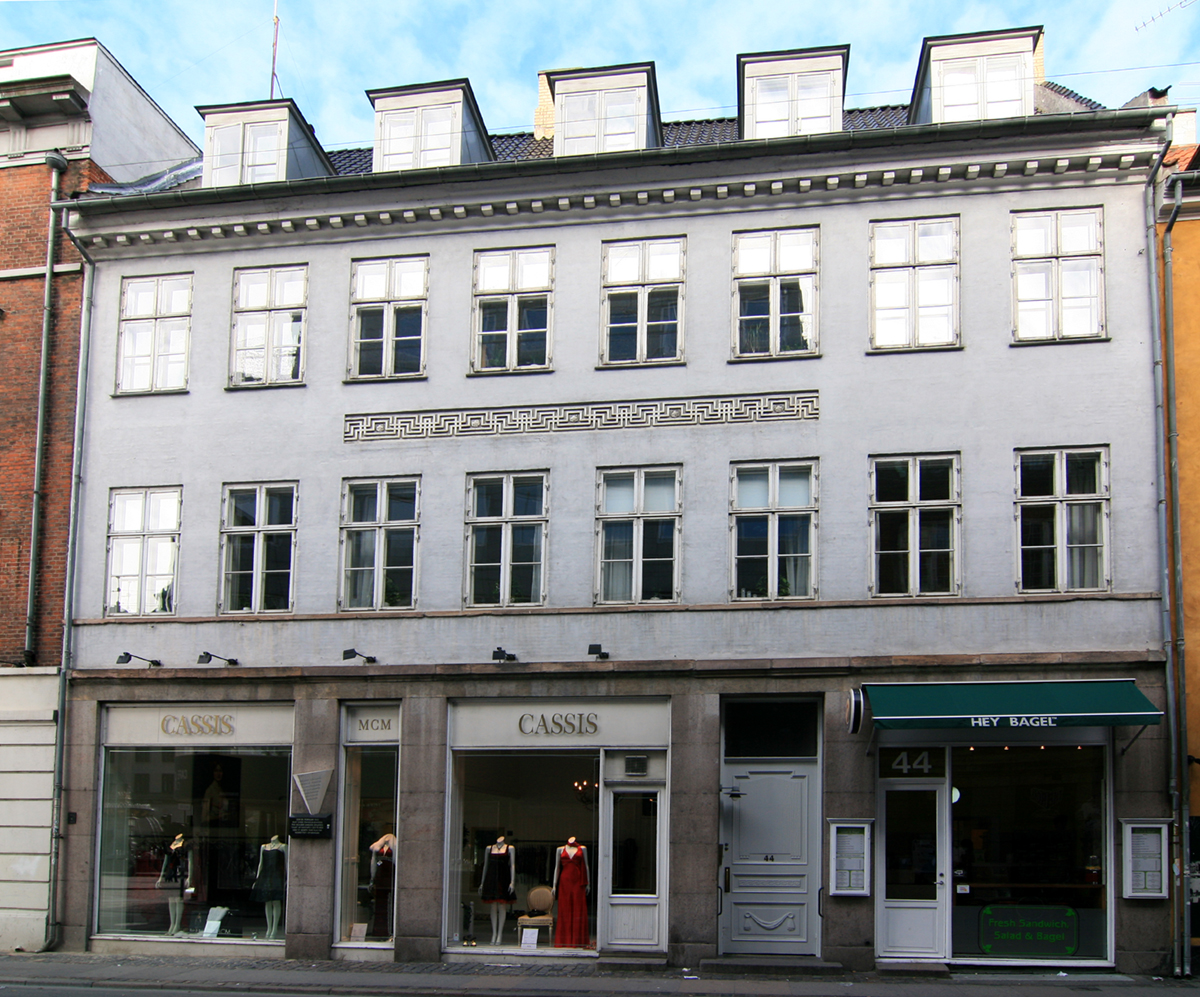
- Interactive map of the Skindergade 44 area

General information
- Location: Copenhagen, Denmark
- Coordinates: 55°40′43.03″N 12°34′21.07″E
- Completed: 1798-1799

Skindergade 44 is a Neoclassical property situated on Skindergade, off Gammeltorv, in the Old Town of Copenhagen, Denmark. It was listed in the Danish registry of protected buildings and places in 1945.

On the facade of the building is a black stone plaque underneath a cone-shaped stone bearing the names of six members of the Holger Danske World War II resistance group who were arrested at the site by the Gestapo in 1945 and subsequently executed in Ryvangen.

== History ==
=== 18th century ===
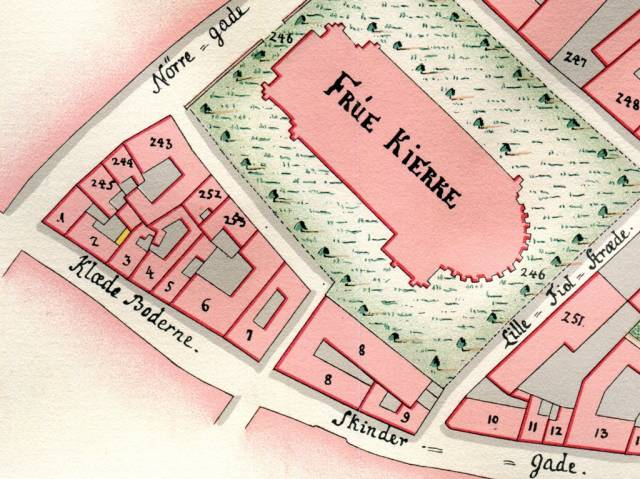
No. 2 seen on a detail from Christian Gedde's map of Klædebo Quarter, 1757.

In the late 17th century, the site was part of two separate properties. One of them was listed as No. 2 in Klædebo Quarter in 1689, owned by merchant Hans Ogelbye. The other one was listed as No. 3 in Klædebo Quarter, owned by ironmonger Samuel Biskop. The two properties were later merged into a single property. It was listed as No. 2 in 1756, owned by tanner (feltbereder) Hans Hellemand.

At the time of the 1787 census, No. 2 was home to a total of 19 people distributed among two households. Elisabeth Soe Bolrtte Cramer (née Schwartzkopf), a 54-year-old widow distiller, resided in the building with her son and three daughters, three distillers, two caretakers and one maid. Elisabeth Soe Bolrtte Cramer's late husband was Baltzar Cramer (1732–1785). Christian Frid. Holm, a stoker at Rentekammeret, resided in the building with his second wife Anne Catharine, a five-year-old son from his first marriage, a maid and a lodger. Svend Pedersen, a beer vendor (øltapper), together with his wife Anne Margrete and their 11-year-old daughter, was also part of the household.

Together with the nearby City Hall and most of the other buildings in the area, the property was destroyed in the Copenhagen Fire of 1795. The current property on the site was constructed in 1798–1799 for Supreme Court attorney Rasmus Lange. The larger property at Kompagnistræde 8 was also built for Rasmus Lange from 1799 to 1800.

=== 19th century ===
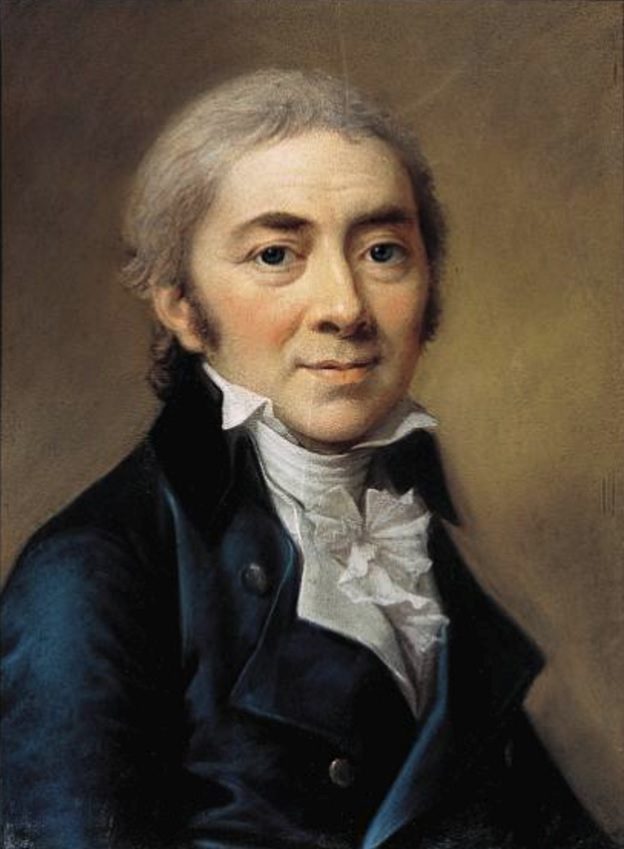
Rasmus Lange

At the time of the 1801 census, No. 2 was home to 25 people distributed among four households. Johan Peter Schotmann, a 29-year-old unmarried wine merchant, resided in the building with two employees in his wine business and one male servant. Jens Thomsen Waad, a businessman, resided in the building with his wife Sophie Cathrine Maria Split, their two sons (aged four and five), an employee, a maid and a lodger. Eiler Christopher Kaasbøl Munthe (Muthe), a teacher at Copenhagen Latin School, resided in the building with his wife Anne Margrethe Kryger, their daughter Sara Johanne Christiane Munthe, his mother-in-law Johanne Christiane Kryger and brother-in-law Helene Kryger, one lodger and two maids. The fourth household consisted of a 61-year-old widow named Fischer with a royal pension and two maids.

In the new cadastre of 1806, the property was again listed as No. 2. It was still owned by Rasmus Lange. Lange was at that time also the owner of No. 251 (now Nørregade 4).

At the time of the 1840 census, No. 2 was home to a total of 31 people distributed among six households. Niels Hendrik Hvalsøe (1764–1842, a pensioner and lottery collector, resided on the ground floor with his wife Thora Birgitte Lind, their son Fritz Emil Hvalsøe, their daughter Margrethe Elisabeth Hvalsøe and two maids. Niels Carl Friess (1787–1862), an overkrigskommisær, resided on the first floor with his wife Sophie Wilhelmine Dahlbom, two daughters (aged seven and ten) and a maid. Caroline Lund née Vorndran, a widow whose husband had worked for Den Almindelige Enkekasse, resided on the second floor with a son, a daughter and a maid. The son Caspar Wolder Vorndran Lund (1809–1975) was pastor of Cigerslev Parish. Ane Marie Petersen née Holm, a widow grocer (høker), resided in the basement with her five children (aged 10 to 20) and one maid. One of her sons was a watchmaker's apprentice. Peter Thortsen Kofoed, a brewery worker (bryggersvend), resided on the first floor with his wife Ane Margrethe Linde, their three children (aged 10 to 13) and mother-in-law. Sophie Charlotte Amalie Larsen, a 42-year-old widow employed with needlework, resided on the second floor of the rear wing with her two daughters (aged 14 and 17).

=== 20th century ===
Axel Janniche & Co., a watchmaker's shop, was based in the ground floor of the building in the first half of the 20th century. It was founded on 2 July 1896 by Axel Janniche (1868–1939).

Janniche & Co. was owned by Gunnar Wibroe at the outbreak of World War II. The shop was used as a meeting place by a chapter of the Holger Danske resistance group during the German occupation of Denmark. The shop manager Georg Stougaard was a member of the group. Gunnar Wibroe was also active in the resistance movement. On 26 February 1945, six members of the group were arrested by the Gestapo and subsequently executed in Ryvangen. Lis Mellemgaard, another member of the group, was not arrested as she had stayed at home with laryngitis and received a warning from Stougaard's wife. Gunnar Wibroe was released a few hours after the arrest. He was assassinated in his shop on 9 March.

Kunstsalen (Kaj Frandsen, kunsthandel), an art dealer, was based in the building in 1950. The company had been founded back in 1852 as a bookshop by Theodor Lind (1823–1896). It was continued by Hans Frandsen (1869–1934) from 1896. On his death, it was continued by his widow, Ella Maria Frandsen (née von Scharffenberg, born 1874), with their son Kaj Frandsen as manager. From 1943, it was owned by Kaj Frandsen (born 1901).

The property was owned by Ea/S Gøyernes Gaard in 2008, a company founded in Næstved in 1947. The company was dissolved in 2020.

== Architecture ==
Skindergade 44 is a seven-bay-long and three-storey-tall building. The plastered facade is finished with a belt course above the ground floor, a substantial cornice supported by corbels below the roof and a Greek key frieze between the four central windows of the two upper floors. The pitched tile roof features five dormer windows.

== Commemorative plaque ==
On the facade of the building is a black stone plaque underneath a cone-shaped stone bearing the names of six Holger Danske members who were arrested there by the Gestapo in 1945 and subsequently executed in Ryvangen. The inscription on the black stone reads:

Den 26. Februar 1945
Blev Disse Frihedskæmpere
Fra Holger Danske-Gruppen
Taget af Gestapo i Dette Hus
Den 17. Marts 1945 Blev de
Henrettet i Ryvangen

Translation:

On February 26, 1945
These Freedom Fighters
From the Holger Danish Group
Were taken by the Gestapo in this house
On March 17, 1945, they were
Executed in Ryvangen

The names of the six men listed on the cone-shaped stone are:

- Hans Brahe Salling
- Svend Borup Jensen
- Leo Christensen
- Georg Stougaard
- Ole Mosolff
- Kaj Ohlsen

== Today ==
Warhammer is based in the ground floor of the building.
