= Københavns Hørkræmmerlaug =

Guild in Copenhagen

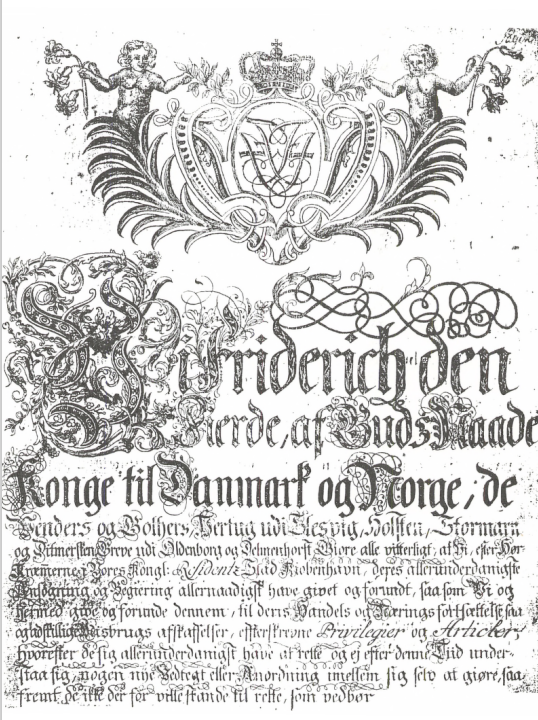
The front page of the royal charter from 1722

Københavns Hørkræmmerlaug was one of five merchant's guilds in Copenhagen, Denmark. It organized citizens with citizenship (borgerskab) as hørkræmmer, a type of retailer with license to deal in a wide range of specified products.

== History ==
Københavns Hørkræmmerlaug's first royal charter was granted by Frederick IV in 1722.

The hørkræmmer shops were typically located close to the city gates or the city's principal marketplaces.

In 1742, Københavns Hørkræmmerlaug acquired a 20-year monopoly on trade with Iceland. In 1758, it was discontinued due to the guild's harsh treatment of the Icelandic population.

== Membership ==
Citizenship as a hørkrlmmer required that the candidate was 25 years old and had been an apprentice for seven years. The latter requirement did not apply for sons of a hørkræmmer who could become a hørkræmmersvend (trained employee of a hørkræmmer) from the age of 18, provided that they had worked in their father's shop.

Hørkræmmer shops were licensed to deal in a wide range of products. These included flax, hemp, hobs, bar iron, untreated steel, tar, pitch, whale oil, salt, salted meet, salted and cured fish, masonry heaters, coal, Russian leather and whetstones.

== Aldermen ==
- 1726–1747: David Johan Berendz (Berndt)
- 1747-: Hans Christian Brock
- 1790–1798: Børge Nicolai Fogh
- 1798-: Tgøger From
- Caspar Müller

== Notable members ==
This list is incomplete.

Name	Citizenship	Location	Notes
Christopher Jensen Fogh	1722-		
1822-	Skindergade 45		
David Johan Berendz	1722-		
Oluf (Ole) Hansen Aagaard	1722-		
Bertel Jegind	1723-	Nyhavn 65	
Jacob Hørgensen Klog	1824-	Nørregade 53	
Hans Christian Brock	1726-		
Olud Mandix			
Hans Wesling	1757-	Skindergade 45	
Christen Nielsen Waage	1753-	Admiralgade 25	
Hams Pedersen Scane	1768-		
Thøger From	1775–	Rosenborggade 1	
Christian Stæhr	1777 -	Amagertorv 1	
Christian Jørgensen	1787 -	Nyhavn 3	
Peter Andreas Valentin	1787 -	Lille Strandstræde 18	
Peder Waagens	1787 -	Vestergade 1	
Mads Jacobsen Tvermoes	1798-	Kultorvet	
Christian Bechmann	1801 -	Læderstræde 36	
Andreas Christen Lund	1801 -	Snaregade 14	
Isack Bergeskou	1801 -	Snaregade 10	
Wulf Jacob Berns	1801 -	Læderstræde 11	
NielsFrederik Høffding	1801 -	Nørregade 1	
Hector Fr. Janson Worsøe	1830 -	Bestergade 16	
Vilhelm Anders Syndergaard	1840 -	Højbro Plads 17	
Gector Frederik Hansen	1860 -	Nyhavn 13	
Salomon Heimann David	1860 -	Kompagnistræde 32	
Hans Johanes Rønne	1860 -	Kompagnistræde 20	
