= Arnold Busck (bookstore) =

Arnold Busck A/S
- Company type: Private
- Industry: Bookselling, publishing
- Founded: 1896
- Founder: Arnold Busck
- Defunct: 27 April 2020
- Headquarters: Copenhagen, Denmark
- Key people: Helle Busck Fensvig
- Website: www.arnoldbusck.dk

Arnold Busck, named after founder Arnold Busck, is a family-owned Danish company with activities in book distribution and publishing. The Arnold Busck chain of bookstores is one of the largest Danish book retailers with 30 stores.

It went bankrupt on 27 April 2020, during the coronavirus pandemic. 14 of its bookstores were bought by Bog & Idé, while the Arnold Busck brand and it most well-known store in Købmagergade, Copenhagen were bought by JP/Politikens Forlag, owned by JP/Politikens Hus.

== History ==
The company was founded in Copenhagen as Busck & Wisbech by Arnold Busck and J. L. Wisbech in 1896. The first bookshop was located on Pilestræde but moved to larger premises on Gothersgade at No. 49 in 1901. The company changed its name to Arnold Busck after Wisbech left the company in 1902.

In 1922 Arnold Busck acquired Nyt Nordisk Forlag and in 1965 Det Schønbergske Forlag.

In 1941, Arnold Busck's son, Helge Arnold Busck, took over the position as XEO of the company. He was succeeded by his son Ole Arnold Busck in 1969.

== Company ==
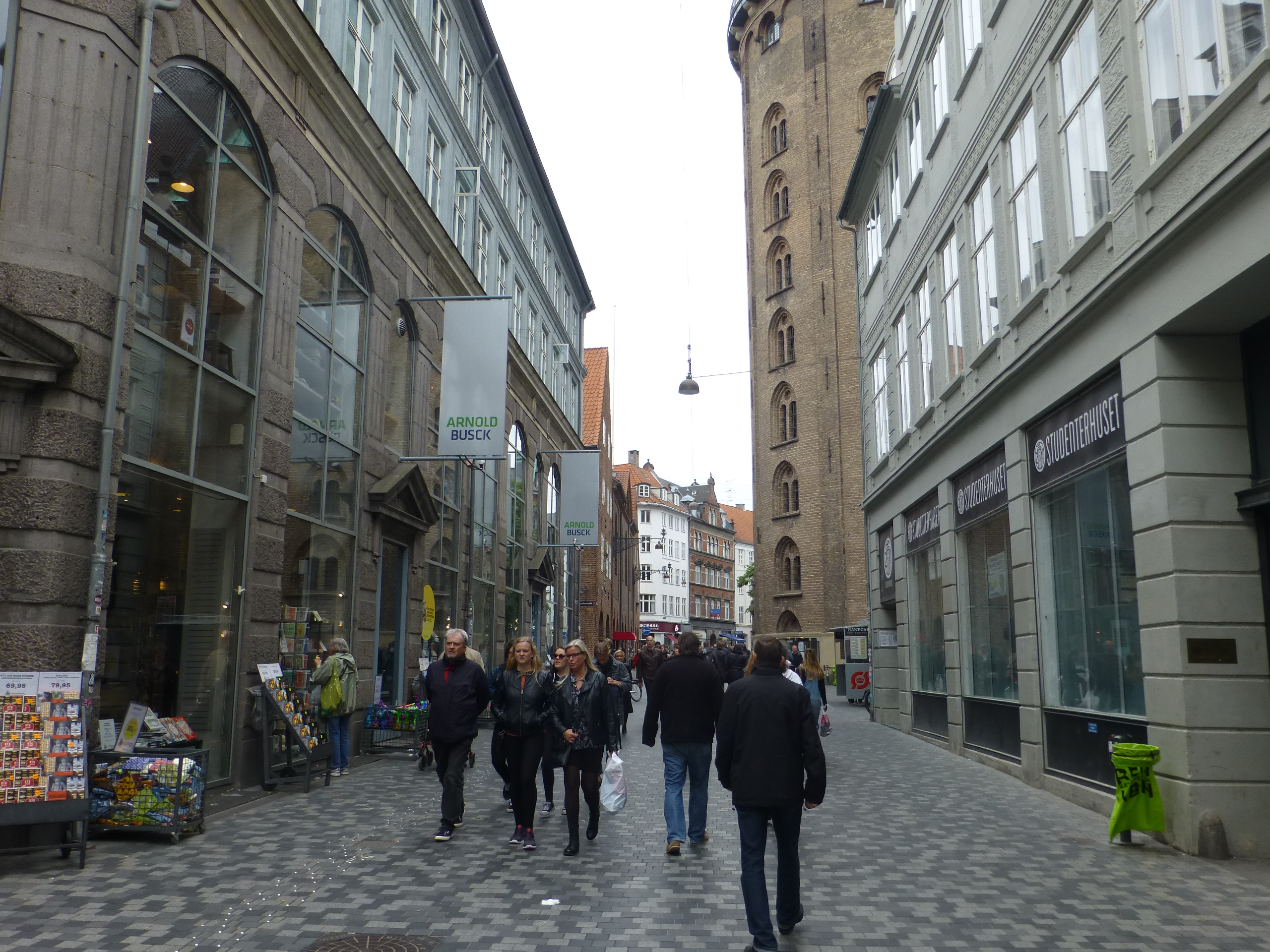
Arnold Busck's flagship bookstore (left) in Købmagergade, Copenhagen.

The chain consists of 30 bookstores, including a flagship store over three storeys at its historical home at Købmagergade 49 in Copenhagen which also contains a Baresso coffee shop. The current CEO is Helle Busck Fensvig, 4th generation of the Busck family.

=== Bookstores ===
Metropolitan Copenhagen (17)

- Ballerup
- Birkerød
- Copenhagen (4)
  - Købmagergade
  - Statens Museum for Kunst
  - Valby
- Hellerup (2)
  - Strandvejen
  - Waterfront Shopping
- Helsinge
- Helsingør (3)
  - Espergærde
  - Helsingør Bycenter
  - Stengade
- Hundige
- Køge
- Kongens Lyngby
- Rødovre
- Roskilde

Lolland-Falster

- Nykøbing Falster

Funen (3)

- Odense (2)
  - Rosengårdcentret
  - Vestergade
- Svendborg

Jutland (12)

- Aalborg (3)
  - Bispensgade
  - Friis
  - Aalborg Storcenter
- Esbjerg
- Haderslev
- Herning
- Hjørring
- Holstebro
- Kolding
- Randers
- Sønderborg
- Vejle
