= Ny Kongensgade 3 =

Building in Copenhagen

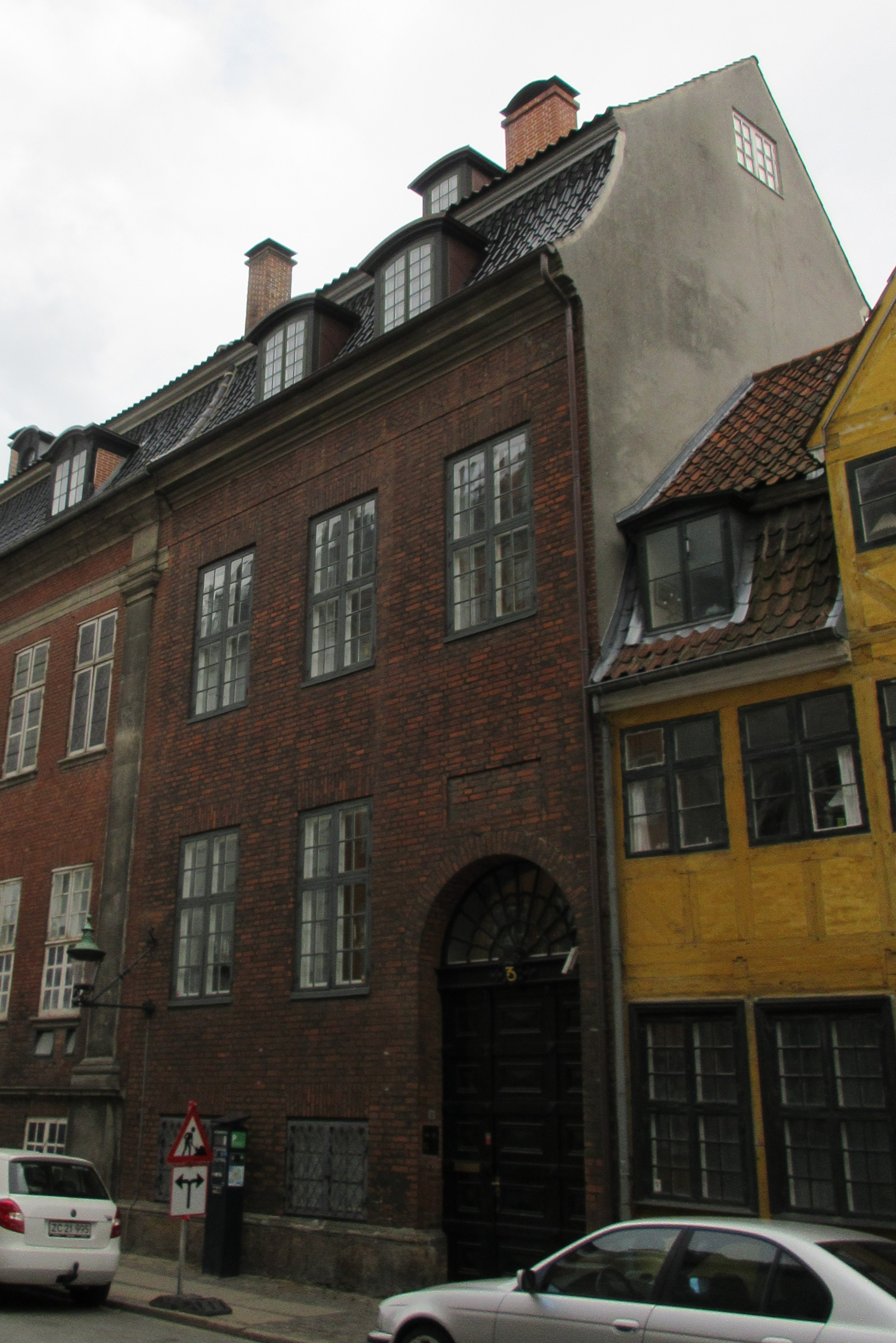
- Ny Kongensgade 3 in 2016
- Interactive map of the Ny Kongensgade 3 area

General information
- Architectural style: Neoclassical
- Location: Copenhagen, Denmark
- Coordinates: 55°40′25.9″N 12°34′36.91″E
- Completed: 1757

Design and construction
- Architect: Philip de Lange

Ny Kongensgade 3 is an 18th-century property located in the small Frederiksholm Quarter of central Copenhagen, Denmark. The building was listed on the Danish registry of protected buildings and places in 1986.

== History ==
=== Early history ===
The site was in 1689 part of a larger property (then No. 294) owned by Christen Jensen. The property was the site of a six bays long one-storey building with a three-bay wall dormer.

=== Barchmann and the new building ===
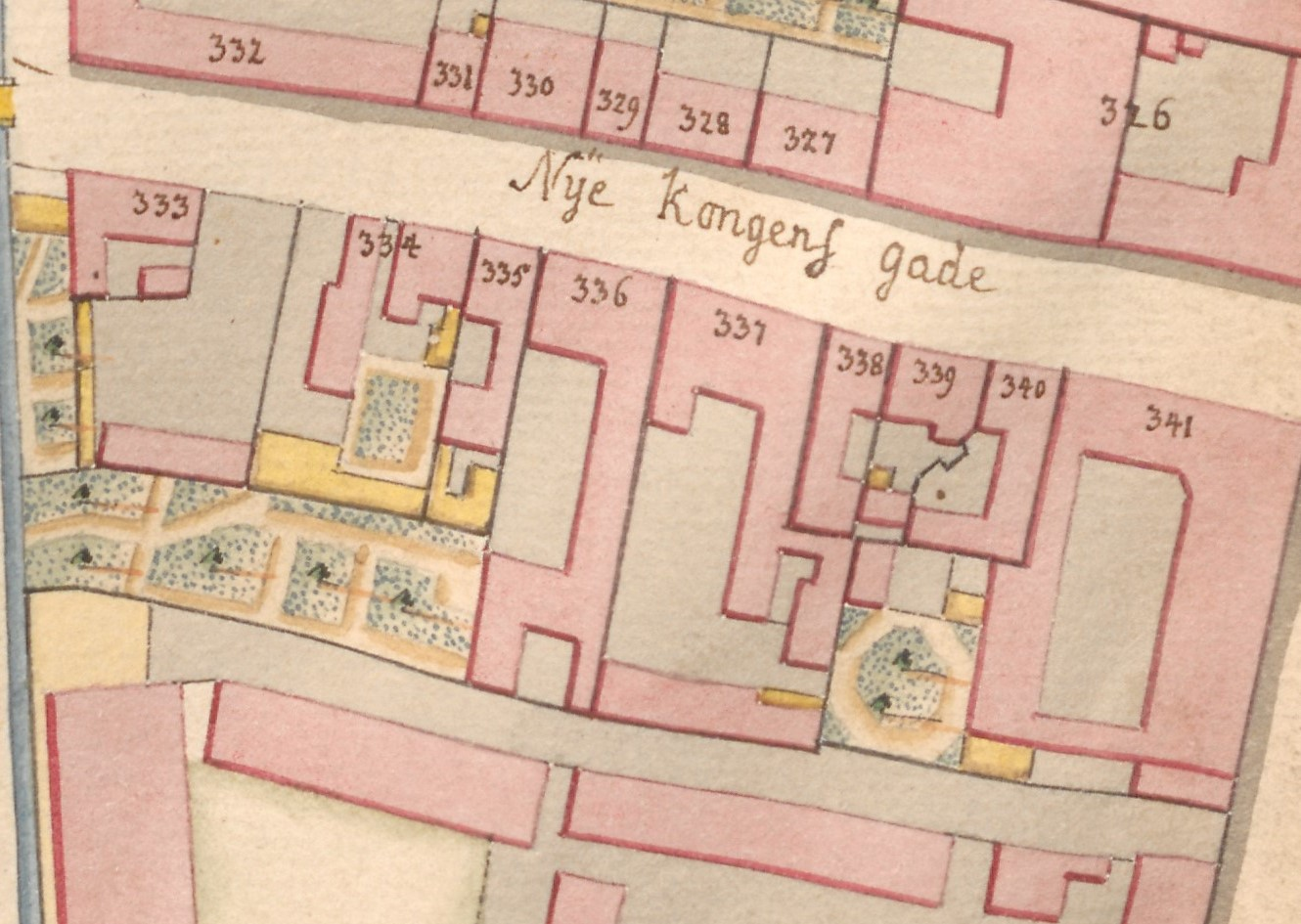
No. 339 seen on a detail from Christian Gedde's map of Copenhagen's West Quarter, 1757.

On 9 December 1747, the property was sold by auction for 1,501 eigsdaler to royal building master Jacob Fortling. He acted on behalf of Jacob Barchmann, who already owned the adjacent Barchmann Mansion at the corner of Frederiksholms Kanal.

The existing building was in 1757 replaced by a new four-storey building. The identity of the architect is not known but it is believed that it was designed by Philip de Lange who had also constructed Barchmann's first mansion at the site. It is assumed that the building was constructed as a rental property.

Barchmann's properties were on 11 March 1779 sold to John and William Brown. The jurist Christian Martfelt (1728-1790) resided in the building in the years 1774–1779.

Kohn and William Brown's firm went bankrupt in 1787. Their properties at the corner of Frederiksholms Kanal at Ny Kongensgade were subsequently sold by auction on 21 February 1788 to different buyers. No. 340 C was sold to Ove Malling for 4,865 rigsdaler. The large corner mansion (No. 341 B) was sold to the lawyer Christopher Hansteen for 12,010 rigsdaler. No. 341 was sold to warehouse manager Ole Christensen for 11,700 rigsdaler.

=== 19th century ===
Matthias Holten, father of professor Carl Holten, purchased the building in 1812.

The building was from 1841 to 1853 owned by Albert Bartholin Hagen. He refurbished the building. The property was in 1877 acquired by merchant Gunni Busck, owner of Scandinavian Preserved Butter company, who that same year also founded Københavns Mælkeforsyning. Busck resided in the building with a housekeeper and a maid at the time of the 1880 census. The only other residents were the concierge August Frederik Mansen, his wife Marie Christiane Mansen and their 11-year-old son.

Busck had gas, plumbing and electricity installed in 1885.

=== 20th century ===
The mansion was in 1917 sold to Henri Odewahn. He was the owner of the leading tea company C. J. Carøe. He refurbished the building with the assistance of the architect Bent Helweg-Møller to. Odewahn was also the owner of the country house Rågegården in Rågeleje.
