= Enigheden =

Danish dairy products company

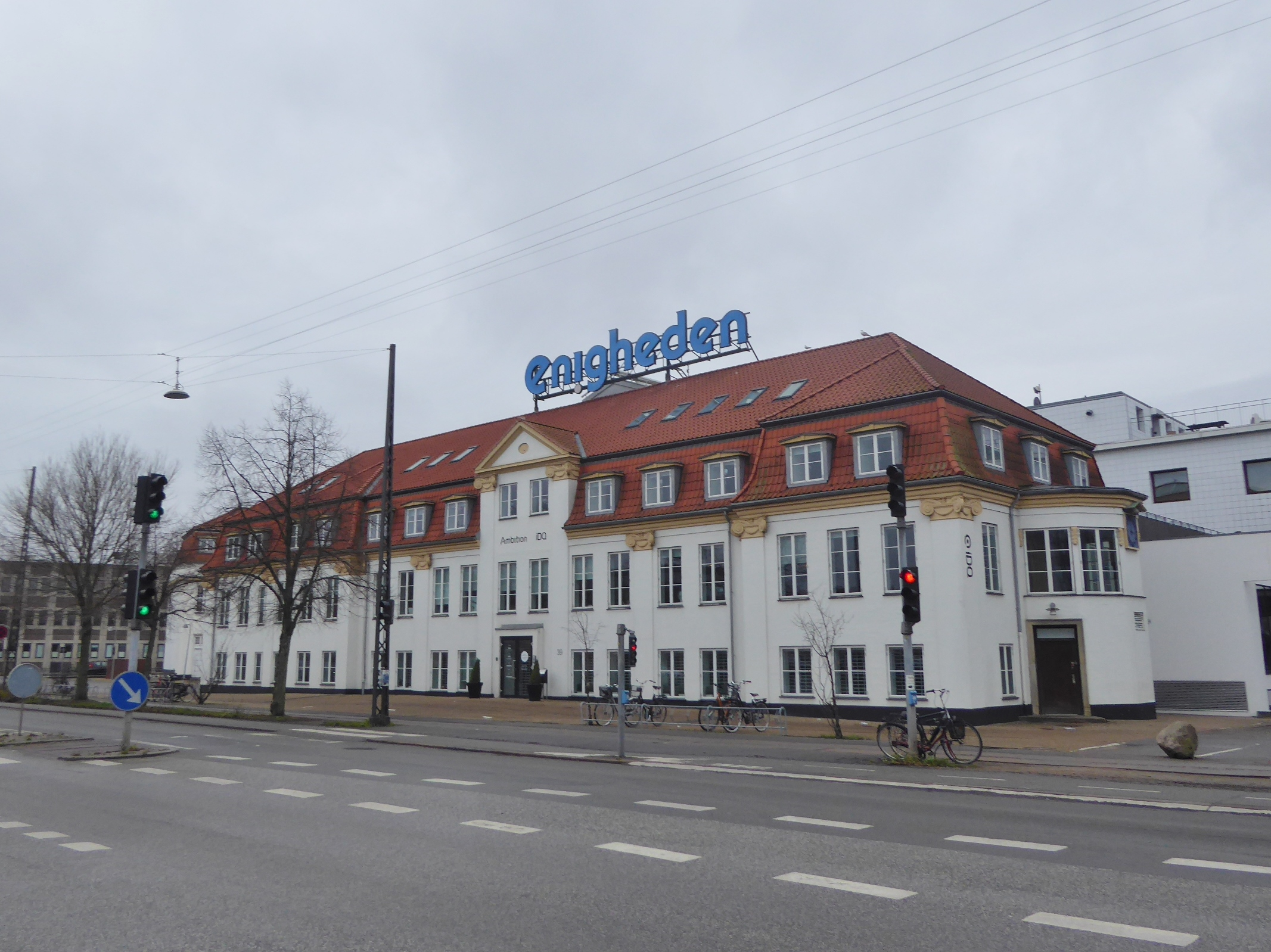
The former Enigheden in Copenhagen.

Mælkeriet Enigheden, usually referred to simply as Enigheden, was a cooperative dairy products company based in Copenhagen, Denmark. It existed from 1897 to 1996 and was from 1906 based at Lygten 39–41 in Nordvest. The Baroque Revival style main building from 1923 is now owned by C. W. Obel and the Lundbeck Foundation through a jointly owned investment company.

== History ==
Mælkeriet Enigheden evolved from a labour dispute at Københavns Mælkeforsyning in 1896. A call for better wages and working conditions from the company's wagoners was rejected by Gunni Busck, prompting them to contact Arbejdsmændenes fagforening (from 1897: Dansk Arbejdsmands Forbund). The trade union's leader, Michael Christian Lyngsie, arranged a meeting at Gimle on 16 November 1896. All the wagoners who attended the meeting ended up joining the labour union. Gunni Busck reacted by initiating a lockout and recruiting people from farms in the vicinity of Copenhagen to do their work. At another meeting, held at Gammel Kro in Smallegade on 20 November 1896, some of the wagoners presented the idea of establishing their own dairy distribution company. The idea won the support of Lyngsie and Mælkeriet Enigheden was established as a limited company (aktieselskab on 29 December 1906. The initial capital was raised through the sale of shares of DKK which were to be repaid by 25 øre per week. The new enterprise tried to purchase uniforms for the wagoners in Holger Petersen's clothing store on Købmagergade but he refused to do business with socialists and a contract was instead closed with Seifert in Tegnegade. Workware for the other employees was sown by some of the wives of the wagoners. Frederik Ludwig Georg Duus from Kastrup Glasværk was initially also reluctant to do business with the new company but he was ultimately convinced by a down payment of DKK 3,000 to deliver the necessary milk bottles. 20 wagons were also acquired and 30 horses were acquired from a horse trader in Holbæk for pulling them. Operations started on 11 March 1897.

The company was initially based in rented premises at the corner of Falkoner Allé and Grundtvigsvej. They soon proved too small but the company could not afford to move to larger ones. This problem was in 1898 solved by Lyngsie by entering into a 10-year partnership with Det Danske Mælke Compagnie, a newly established company with plenty of capital but still only a small customer base. As part of the agreement Mælkeriet Enigheden moved its operations to Det Danske Mælke Compagnie's site on Solbjergvej.

Mælkeriet Enigheden grew steadily over the next few years, increasing its revenues from DKK 600,000 in 1898 to DKK 1.7 millions in 1911. The number of wagons and horses had at the same time increased from 20 wagons and 22 horses in 1898 to 49 wagons and 82 horses in 1911.

By 1906, the company had therefore once again run out of space. It therefore relocated to rented premises in the former Dohlmann's Glue Factory on Alexandravej in the Outer Nørrebro area. The building, which stood on a one-hectare (2.5-acre) site, had its own waterworks. The property was later purchased by the company for DKK 207,000.

In the 1920s, Mælkeriet Enigheden developed into one of the largest processors and distributors on the Danish market. In 1921, the company purchased the estate Lautrupgaard at Ballerup-Måløv. The estate covered approximately 200 hectares (490 acres) of farmland. It also acquired a number of smaller dairy products companies.

The position as managing director of the company was in the 1940s taken over by Viggo Eigtved. In the 1950s and 1960s, as refrigerators became more common, the need for direct delivery of fresh milk to consumers disappeared. Enigheden adapted to the new market situation by instead delivering milk to grocery shops. The Danish dairy market was consolidated up through the 1960s as may smaller cooperative dairy companies merged into larger players. Mejeriselskabet Danmark (later MD Foods) was established in 1970. It acquired Det Danske Mælke Compagnie in 1975 and Enigheden was acquired in 1996.

== Buildings ==
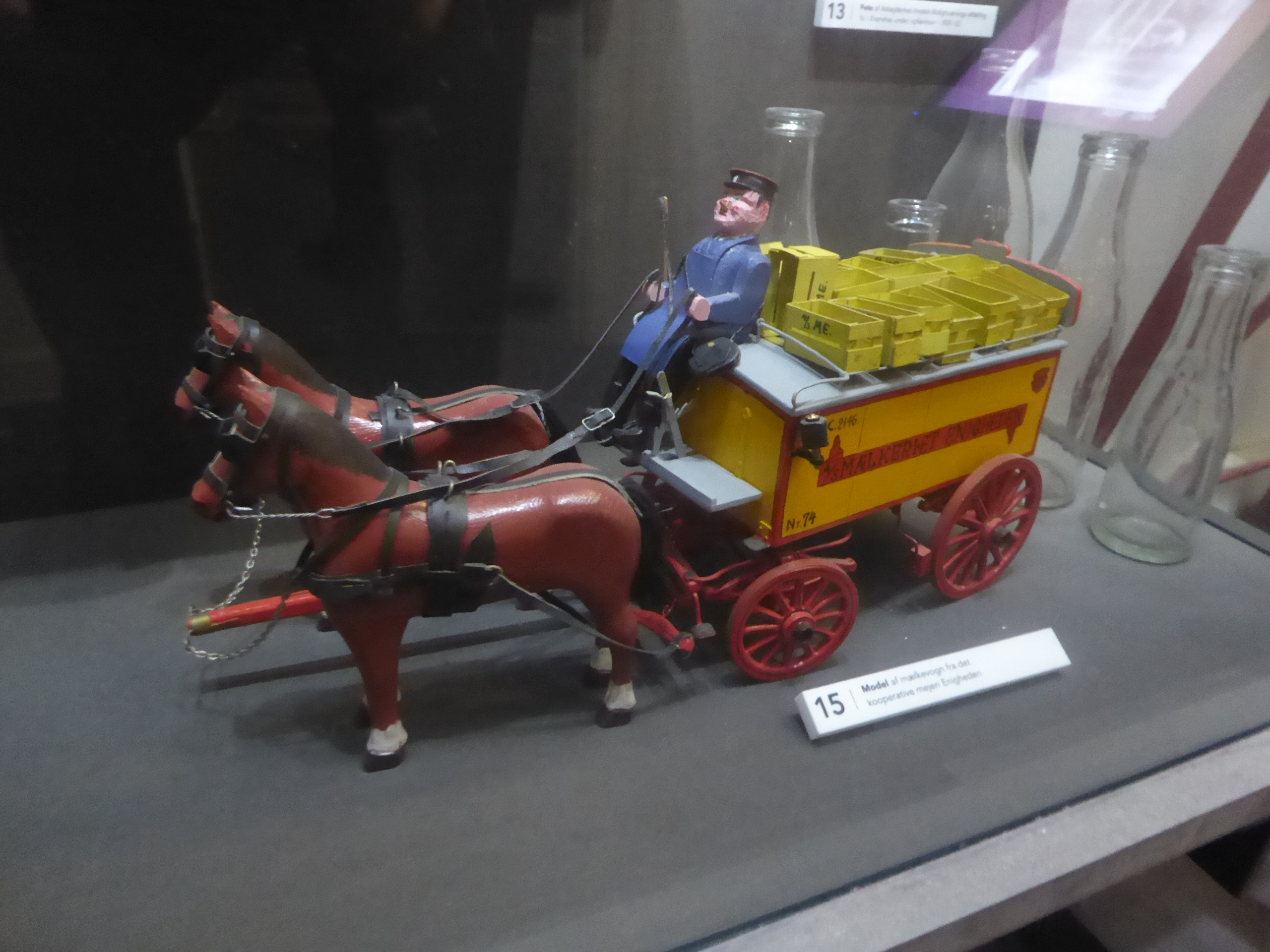
A model of one of Enigheden's milk wagons on display in The Workers Museum in Copenhagen

The existing main building was constructed in 1923 to a B Baroque Revival style design by Heinrich Hansen. The complex was adapted for use as offices in 2009. In 2012 it was acquired by C. W. Obel and the Lundbeck Foundation through the company Obel-LFI Ejendomme.
