= Anders Tinsbo =

Danish sculptor (1938–1994)

- Born: 1938
- Died: 1994 (aged 55–56)
- Education: Academy of Fine Arts, Copenhagen

Anders Tinsbo or Tindsbo (1938–1994) was a Danish sculptor.

== Biography ==
Tinsbo was born Anders Kristensen on October 25, 1938, in Copenhagen, son of Laurids Kristensen and Bodil Tindsbo Kristensen.

Tinsbo, who was initially trained as a stucco-worker, got private tutoring from Mogens Bøggild and joined the Sculpture Department of the Royal Academy of Fine Arts in Copenhagen with Professor Gottfred Eickhoff (1961–1965). He then continued at the Architecture Department (1966–1967) where he taught in bearing constructions until 1976. From there on, his focus was on space and the perception of space.

One of his most famous works, Water Art, was the first modern sculpture to be set up in Copenhagen in 1970. The bronze sculpture was a present to the city by the National Bank of Denmark on the occasion of its 800th year jubilee. It adorns the square near the Round Tower (Rundetårn).

He had many exhibitions in Denmark, Scandinavia as well as in Italy, Germany, France, the Netherlands and the USA. He won 1st and 2nd prizes in the first state competition on computer graphics in 1972 in collaboration with IT engineer Lars Bording. He also experimented with glass fiber, metal and light. He received numerous commissions for public institutions and from Denmark's major corporations (Novo Nordisk, IBM, Superfos, Monberg & Thorsen, Patent Office, Ministry of Defence, Ministry of Foreign Affairs...). He was artistic consultant and decorated the ferry-boat "Peder Paars" for the Danish Railway Union in 1981.

In 1984, he held a 9-month exhibition in the Children’s Museum for the North Jutland Art Museum in Aalborg, which was granted the KD award. In 1987, he created the water art fountain in the baroque gardens of Lerchenborg Castle. In 1990, he completed a major work for the headquarters of Denmark's leading insurance company Danica, consisting of four 3-meters high glass-fiber mobiles.

Starting with massive bronze lumps, he constantly stretched the curves, pursuing maximum tension and lightness. During his last ten years he produced "space drawings": steel or glass fiber shapes, floating and vibrating with life. For these, he was granted the "Poets' Price" in 1988, an unusual acknowledgement for a non-writer.

His last installation was an 8-meter-high tube sculpture in stainless steel placed in front of Copenhagen’s Hamlet hospital in December 1993.

He died on October 14, 1994, in Copenhagen.

More than twenty years after his death, many of his works are present in public spaces in Denmark

He is also represented in National Gallery of Denmark, Copenhagen (Denmark), Funen's Art Museum, Odense (Denmark), HEART Herning Museum of Contemporary Art, Herning (Denmark), Modern Art Museum Pagani, Legnano (Italy) and Frederick R, Weisman Foundation, Los Angeles (USA).

== Other publications ==
- Tinsbo, Anders (1987). Det er Tinsbo. Copenhagen: Nyt Nordisk Forlag Arnold Busck A/S (in English and Danish)
- Weekendavisen 22/10/1994 (obituary in Danish)
