= Arnold Busck =

Danish bookseller and publisher (1871–1953)

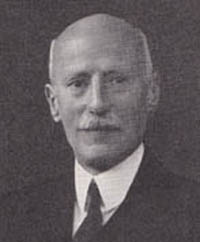
- Photograph of Arnold Busck
- Born: 29 November 1871; Roskilde, Denmark
- Died: 22 February 1953 (aged 81); Frederiksberg, Copenhagen
- Occupation: Businessman
- Known for: Arnold Busck A/S
- Awards: Order of the Dannebrog

Arnold Andreas Bull Ahrensen Busck (29 November 1871 – 22 February 1953) was a Danish bookseller and publisher, founder of Arnold Busck A/S, Denmark's largest chain of bookstores.

== Early life and education ==
Arnold Busck was born into a well-educated and moderately wealthy family in Roskilde to Theodor Busck and Fanny Elisabeth Busck née Ahrensen. His father was principal at Duebrødre Kloster and Hospital and was later appointed as Chancellor (kancelliråd). His maternal grandfather, professor Arnold Ahrensen, a medical doctor, was co-founder of Ugeskrift for Læger. His paternal grandfather was an estate owner whose brother was the priest Gunni Busck, a friend of N. F. S. Grundtvig.

After finishing his preliminary exams in 1888, Busck was an apprentice at Schønemann in Nyborg and worked for Det Reitzelske Forlag, a publishing house.

== Career ==
At the age of 25, together with J. L. Wisbech, he opened his first bookshop on Pilestræde in Copenhagen under the name Busck & Wisbech. Wisbech left the company in 1903. In 1922 Busck acquired Nyt Nordisk Forlag.

== Personal life ==
Busck married twice. His first wife was Johanne Kirstine Camilla Gliemann (28 November 1875 - 29 April 1918), a daughter of pharmacist in Egtved and later Viborg Wilhelm Theobald Gliemann (1832-1919) and Clara Matilde Olsen (1844-1927). They were married on 17 July 1902 in Viborg. His second wife was Eva Kaia Gerda Jørgensen (29 June 1887 - 24 June 1952), a daughter of businessman Heinrich Otto Jørgensen (1859-1924) and Anna Dorthea Frederiksen (1862-1934). They were married on 10 July 1924 in Store Magleby Church in Dragør.

Busck died in 1953. He is buried at Assistens Cemetery in Copenhagen.
