= Nyhavn 3 =

Building in Copenhagen, Denmark

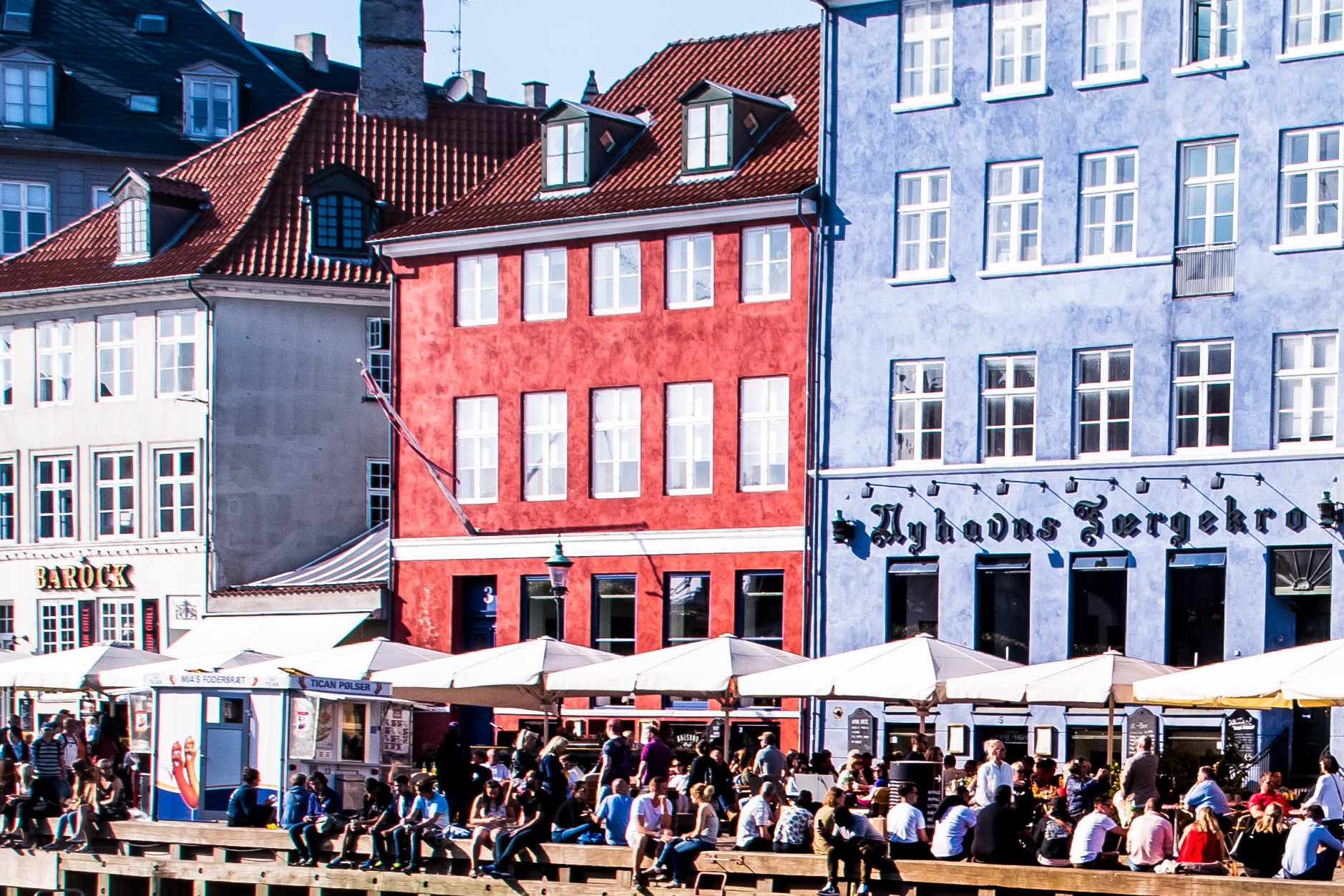
- Interactive map of the Nyhavn 3 area

General information
- Location: Copenhagen, Denmark
- Coordinates: 55°40′50.77″N 12°35′17.41″E
- Completed: Before 1731
- Renovated: 1738, 1776 and 1852

Nyhavn 3 is an 18th-century property overlooking the Nyhavn Canal in central Copenhagen, Denmark. It was listed in the Danish registry of protected buildings and places in 1945.

== History ==
=== 18th century ===
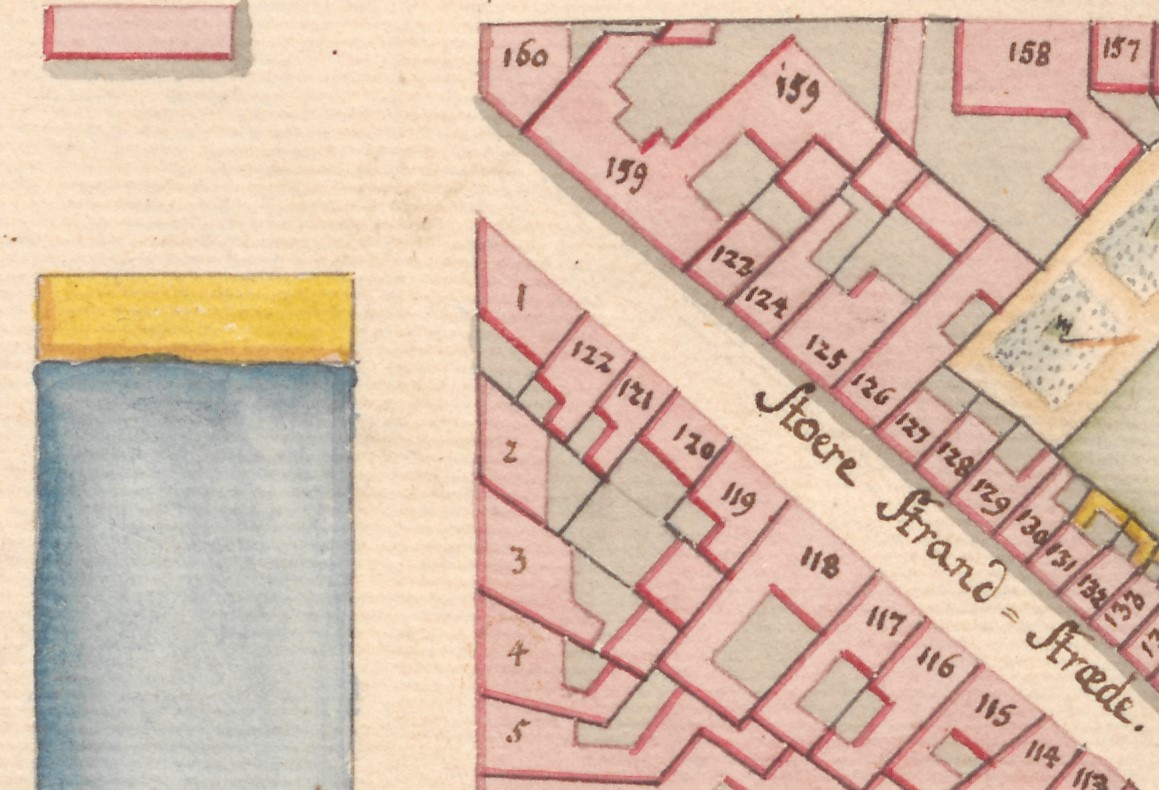
No. 2 seen in a detail from Christian Gedde's map of St. Ann's East Quarter, 1757

The property was listed as No. 2 in St. Ann's East Quarter in Copenhagen's first cadastre of 1689. It was at that time owned by merchant Peder Hansen. The present building on the site was constructed before 1731. The property was again listed as No. 2 in the new cadastre of 1756 and was at that time owned by Gothhelf Florian Drachmand.

The property was home to 14 residents in two households at the time of the 1787 census. Christian Jørgensen, a grocer (hørkræmmer), resided in the building with his wife Kirstine Jørgens Datter, one male servant, one maid and two lodgers. Jockum Christian Sextus, a county barber (surgeon), resided in the building with his wife Kirstine Margthe Heegaard, their one-year-old daughter, three barbers, one apprentice and one maid.

=== 19th century ===
No.2 was home to 15 residents in three households at the 1801 census. Jacob Asmussen, a master shoemaker, resided in the building with his eight-year-old son Jens Monsgaard, his 23-year-old niece Lovise Hansen, a housekeeper, a maid and two lodgers. Rasmus Jensen Beck, a 66-year-old sailing master, resided on the first floor. Johan Schreiber, a workman, resided in the building with county surgeon Johan Andreas Ranfft (1761-1822), surgeon Gotlieb Schultz, two surgeon's apprentices and one maid.

The property was again listed as No. 2 in the new cadastre of 1806. It was at that time owned by merchant Jacob Asmussen.

The property was later purchased by Johan Andreas Ranfft (cf. the 1801 census). Johan Andreas Ranfft was born in 1761 in Wolgast in Swedish Pomerania. He was the son of a county surgeon and trained under his father. He came to Copenhagen in 1783. He was employed as a military surgeon (Kompagnikirurg) at the Danish Life Regiment from 1786 to 1791. On 23 November 1791, he passed his exams as a surgeon from the University of Copenhagen. On 23 June 1792, he acquired the position as county surgeon in Maribo County from Frants Martin Norlin. On 10 July 1793, he was granted citizenship in Copenhagen. In 1796, he was employed as the first police physician in Copenhagen. On 23 April 1801, he became county surgeon in Copenhagen County. In 1814–1820, he was elected as alderman of the Barbers' Guild.

On 12 July 1814, Ranfft was married to Mette Christine Jørgensen Hylleberg (1661-1845) in Store Magleby Church. He sold the property again prior to his death in 1822 but he and his wife remained in one of the apartments as tenants.

The property was home to 10 residents in three households at the time of the 1834 census. Mette Christine Ranfft, who continued her late husband's barber's business, resided on the ground floor with her daughter Johanne Christine Ranfft, two barbers, two barber's apprentices and one maid. Johan Gottlieb Wruck, a master tailor, resided alone on the first floor. Jean Louis Felix Müller and Johan Peter Svane, an office clerk and a grocer (hørkræmmer), resided on the second floor.

The building was still owned by Mette ChristineRBanff in 1840. She was still residing on the ground floor with her daughter, one barber, two apprentices and one maid. Johan Gottlieb Wenck was still residing on the first floor. Jean Louis Müller, bow registered as an office clerk and translator of the Dutch language, resided alone on the second floor. Johan Peter Svane, a hosier (hosekræmmer), resided in the basement.

The property was prior to the 1845 census taken over by master barber Georg Hennings. He was at that time residing in the building with his wife Oline Schjørmann, their one-year-old daughter and one maid. Christine Ransst, widow of county surgeon J.A. Ransst, resided on the first floor with Johanne Ransst and one maid. Christian Frederik Albrecht, a captain at the 1st Artillery Regiment, resided on the second floor. Adolph Christian Crone, a grocer (hørkræmmer), resided in the basement.

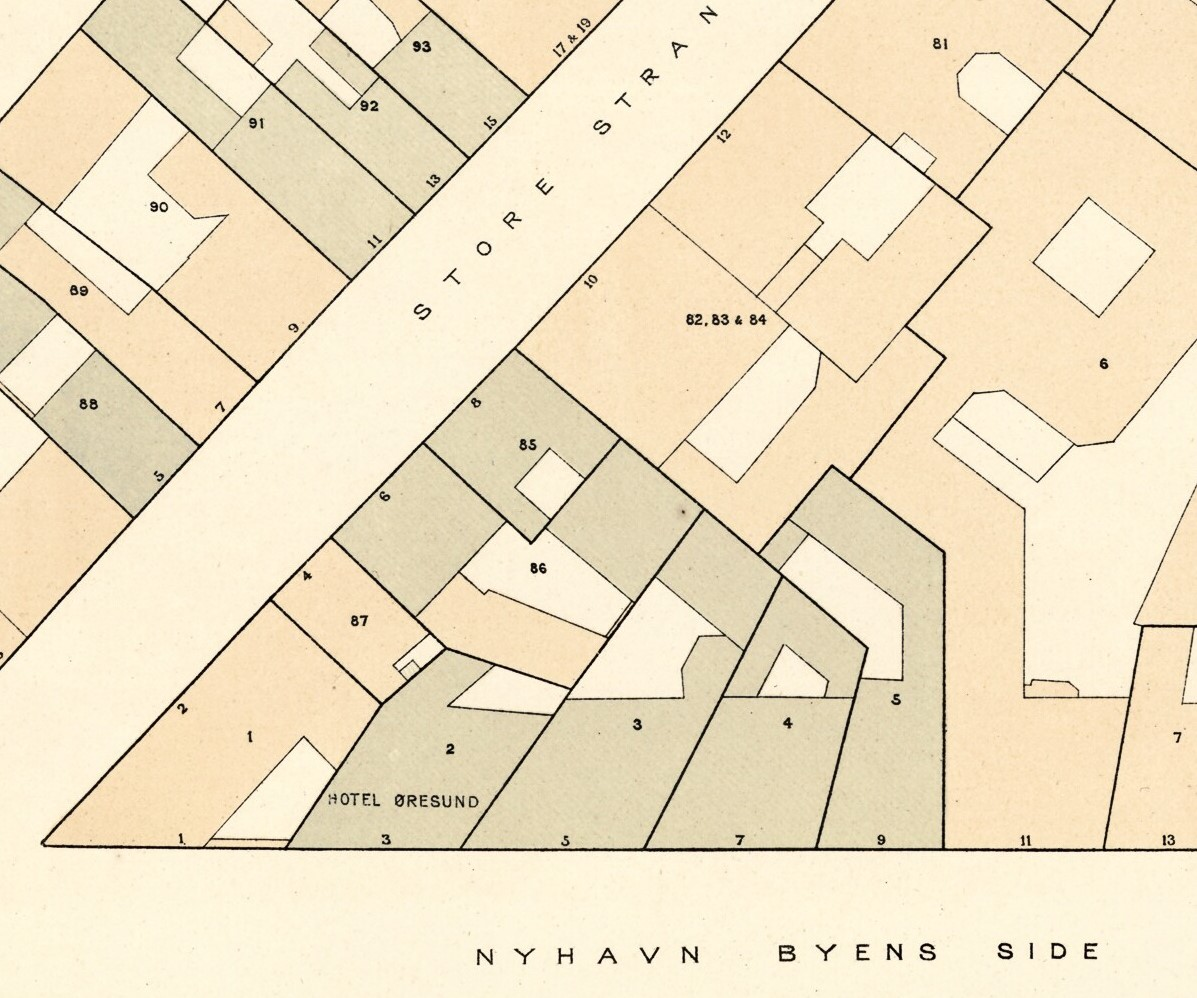
Nyhavn 3 seen on one of Berggreen's block plans of St. Ann's East Quarter

The property was for the first time in almost one hundred years not home to a barber at the time of the 1850 census. Anders Hansen Funch (1806-1864), a clockmaker, resided on the ground floor with his sister C.I. Funch and the apprentice Peter Christian Petersen. Peter Davidsen, a clockmaker employed in Funch's workshop, resided on the first floor with the ship captain S. Andersen and Andersen's mother Magdalene Andersen. Adolph Christian Crone, the grocer (hørkræmmer) from the 1845 census, was now residing on the second floor with his wife Wilhelmine Marie Crone, their two-year-old daughter, an apprentice and a male servant.

Anders Hansen Funch was originally from Bornholm.He trained as a clockmaker under court clockmaker Frederik Jürgensen in Copenhagen until 1833. On 7 March 1835, he was granted citizenship as a clockmaker in Copenhagen. He died unmarried and without children in 1864. His workshop was continued by his employee Poul Christian Louw.

The property was home to four households at the 1860 census. Anders Funch resided in the building with the apprentice Peter Schackinger. Thomas Petersen, a hotel owner, resided in the building with his wife Anne Marie Petersen (née Christensen), their two children (aged four and 11), one male servant and two maids. Marie Schrøder, a widow employed as factory worker, resided in the building with her daughter Nathalia Schrøder. Svend Larsen, proprietor of a tavern, resided in the building with his wife Maren Larsen (née Petersen), one male servant and two maids.

=== Hotel Øresund ===
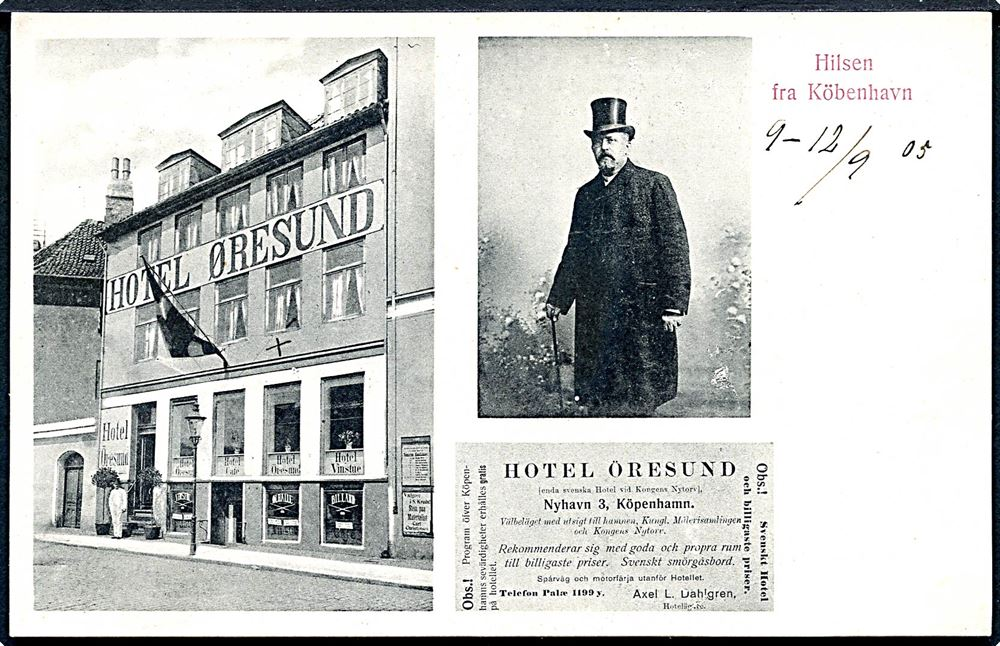
Hotel Øresund

The property was later operated as a hotel under the name Hotel Øresund. The hotel's bar was called Aligator Bar in the 1950s.

== Architecture ==
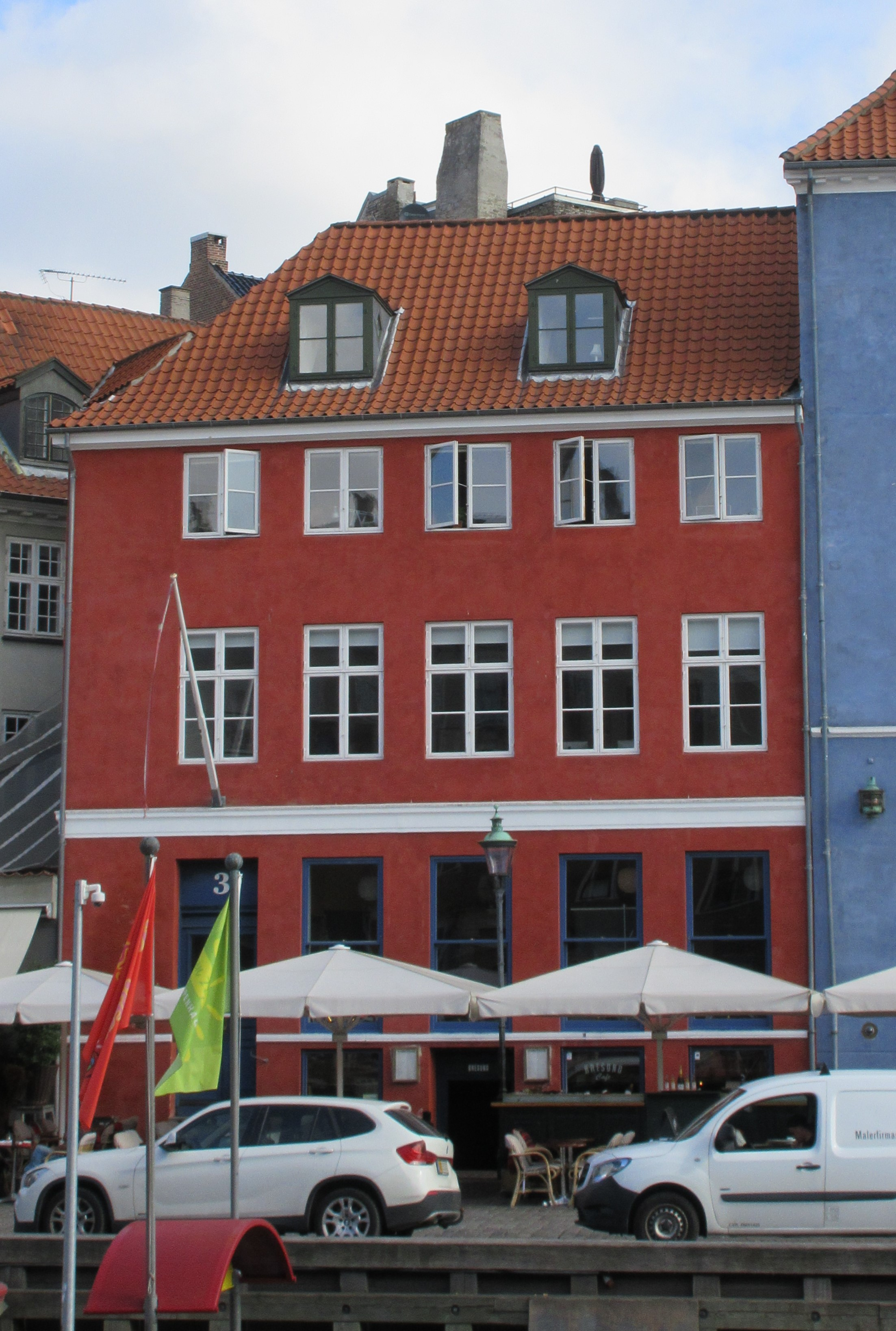
Nyhavn 3

Nyhavn 3 was originally constructed with two storeys over a walk-out basement before 1731. The building was then eight bays wide and the facade was crowned by a two-bay gabled wall dormer. The ground floor was constructed in brick while the upper part was constructed with timber framing. The building was heightened with one storey topped by a triangular pediment in 1776. The triangular pediment disappeared when the facade was reconstructed as a five-bay brick facade 1852. The ground floor of the yard side was also reconstructed in brick while the timber framing on its upper part has survived. The facade of the building is plastered and painted in a dark red colour, contrasted by white-painted bands above the basement and first floor, a white-painted cornice and white painted window frames. The pitched red tile roof is taller towards the yard as a result of the extra floor towards the street. It features two dormer windows the street and a large factory dormer and two normal dormer windows towards the yard. The shop interior in the basement dates from 1819. A small appendix with a staircase projecting of the yard side of the building was probably constructed some time between 1776 and 1801.

== Today ==
The building is owned by Nyhavn 43 A/S. It contains a restaurant on the ground floor and offices on the upper floors.
