= Mahnfeldt House =

Listed property fronting the Nyhavn canal in Copenhagen, Denmark

Manfeldt House
- Mahnfeldts Gård
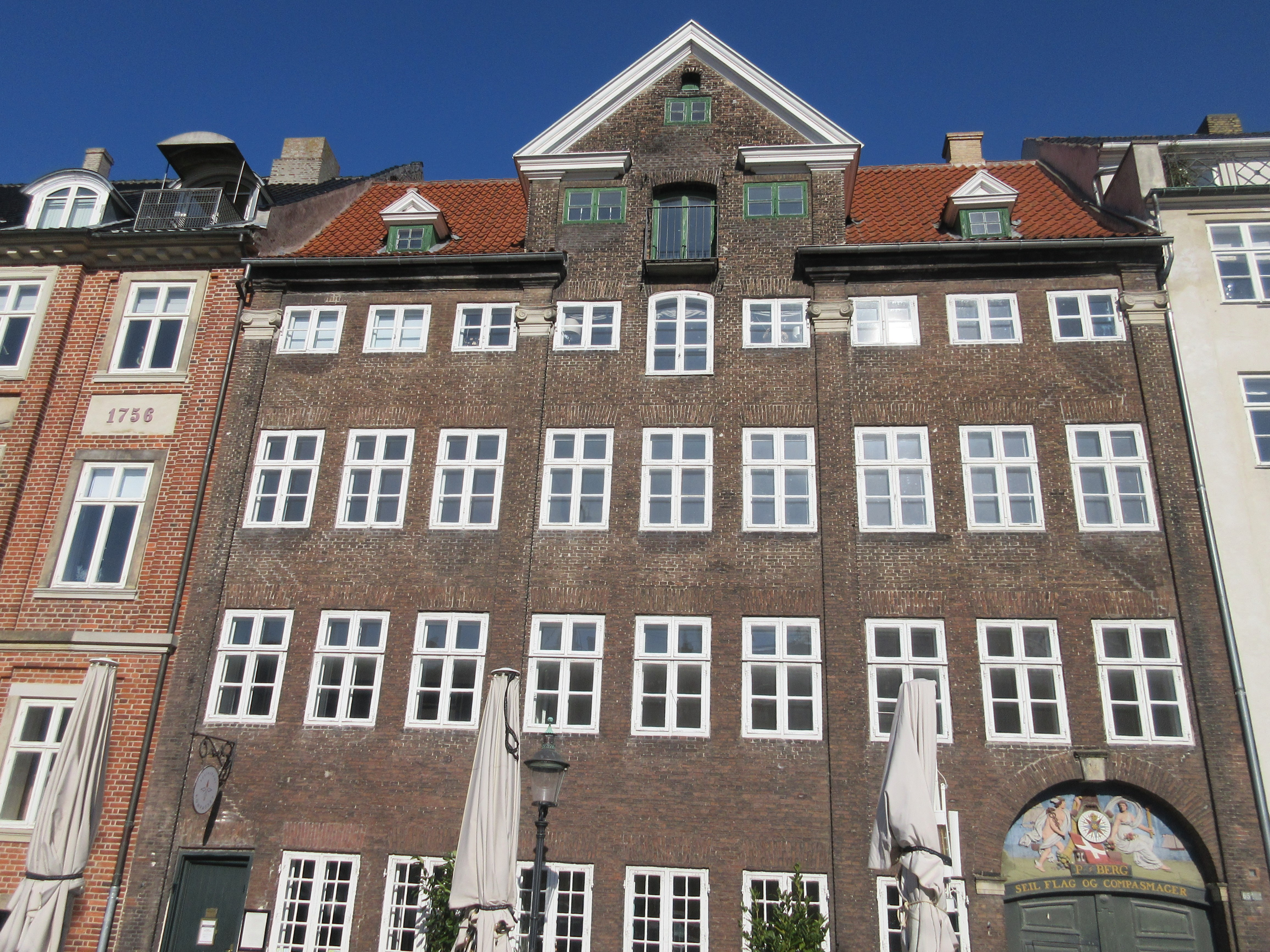
- The house seen from the other side of the canal
- Interactive map of the Manfeldt House area

General information
- Architectural style: Baroque
- Location: Copenhagen, Denmark
- Coordinates: 55°40′46.41″N 12°35′33.84″E
- Completed: 1739

The Mahnfeldt House (Danish: Mahnfeldts Gård) is a listed property fronting the Nyhavn canal in Copenhagen, Denmark. It takes its name from the company E. Mahnfeldt, which was based at the site from 1852 to 1942.

== Architecture ==
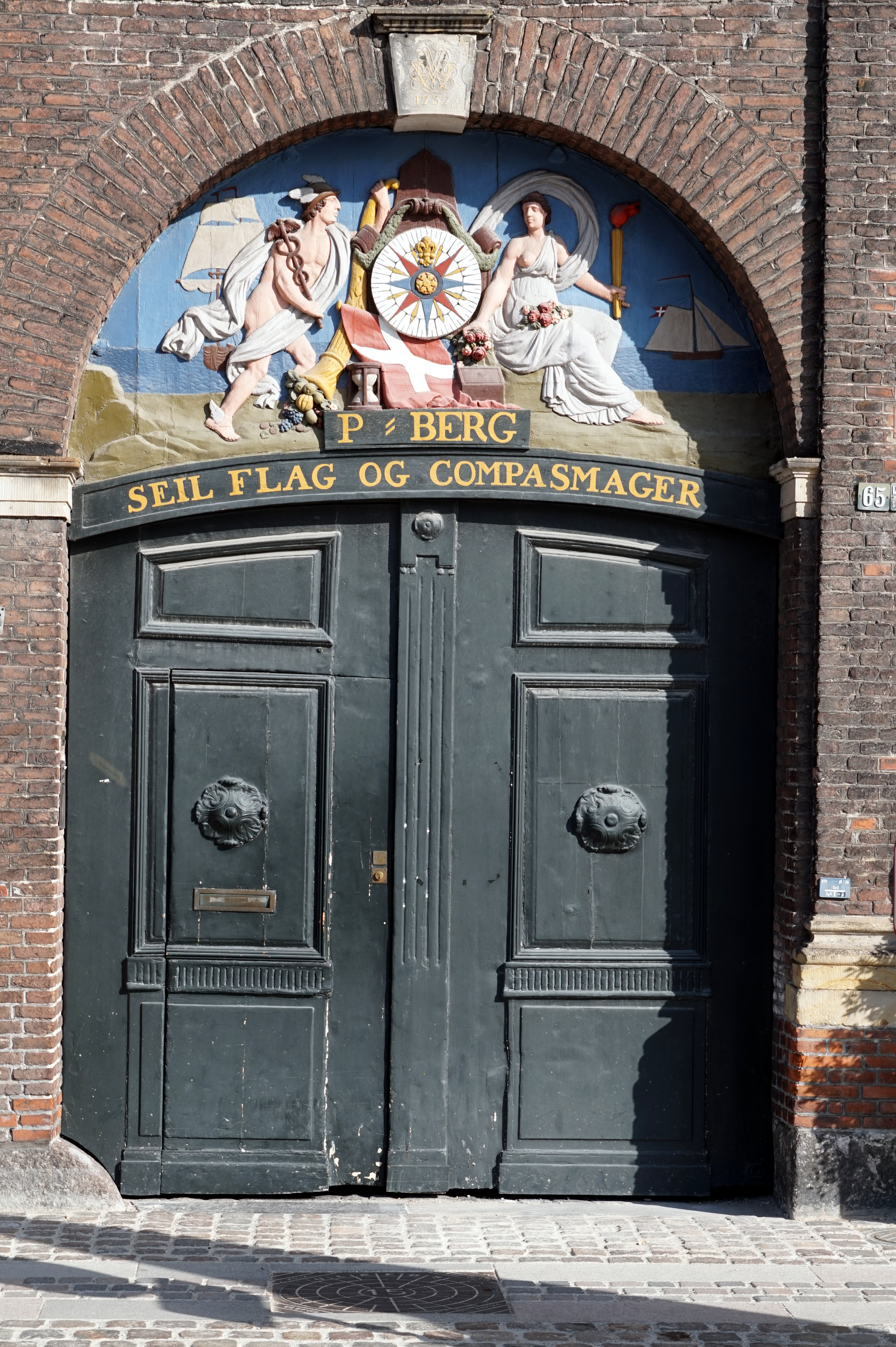
The gate with the relief restored

The Mahnfeldt House stands in blank brick over four storeys and is nine bays wide. The three central bays are flanked by two pillars and are tipped by a three-bay wall dormer. Above the gate is a compass rose surrounded by three figures. Below is an hourglass, a swallowtail flag and a compass. The figure to the left represents Mercury. A seated woman holds a torch in her hand and has flowers in her lap.

Two half-timbered side wings extend from the rear side of the building. The western side wing is in two storeys and dates from some time between 1739 and 1756. The eastern side wing is in three storeys and dates from some time between 1756 and 1801. The courtyard also contains a half-timbered rear wing and a three-storey, half-timbered warehouse.

== See also ==
- Københavns Hørkræmmerlaug
