= Water Art =

Sculpture by Danish artist Anders Tinsbo

Coordinates: 55°40′53″N 12°34′32″E

- Artist: Anders Tinsbo
- Year: 1967-1970
- Type: Bronze on granite
- Location: Copenhagen

Water Art (Danish: Vandkunst) is a sculpture by Danish artist Anders Tinsbo that is on permanent display near Rundetårn in Copenhagen.

It is composed of a bronze sculpture measuring 1.65 m tall and 2.20 m wide that rests on a rectangular red granite plinth, the surface glistened by flowing water. The sculpture was cast using a lost-wax (cire-perdue) process, and the plinth made of Argentinian granite with a polished mirror-like surface and roughly hewn sides. The sculpture and plinth are mounted on a concrete base that contains a hidden water-pump that decalcifies and recirculates the water.

The tense, round curves and the polished bronze surface of the sculpture come together in a simple, soft movement winding around its core, which is space, and mirroring itself in the water-washed granite plinth. The work invites associations with sculptors like Henry Moore, Max Bill, Jean Arp, Brancusi and Alberto Viani. Tinsbo himself described his art as the "feeling of density, pressure and strength expressing itself in the plump parts, while the hollow spaces give an impression of lightness".

== History ==
The Water Art sculpture by Anders Tinsbo was commissioned by the National Bank of Denmark in 1967 to mark the 800th birth anniversary of the City of Copenhagen. It was unveiled on 23 November 1970 on the then very busy Kultorvet Square and moved adjacent to the more intimate Rundetårn at a later date. The National Bank chose to give the commission to a 28-year-old sculptor who had left the Academy of Fine Arts only 2 years previously with the brief instruction that the work should be in bronze, of a modest height, and should include water.

The unveiling of the sculpture split the opinion of people in Copenhagen and while the majority was in favor of it, the traditionalists disagreed, comparing it to a car wreck, a broken violin or even misshapen private parts. The controversy was understandable as it was one of the first modern sculptures to be installed in Copenhagen. The artist himself refused to name the sculpture, thereby inviting viewers and critics alike to form their own associations.
