= Amagertorv 1 =

Property in Copenhagen, Denmark

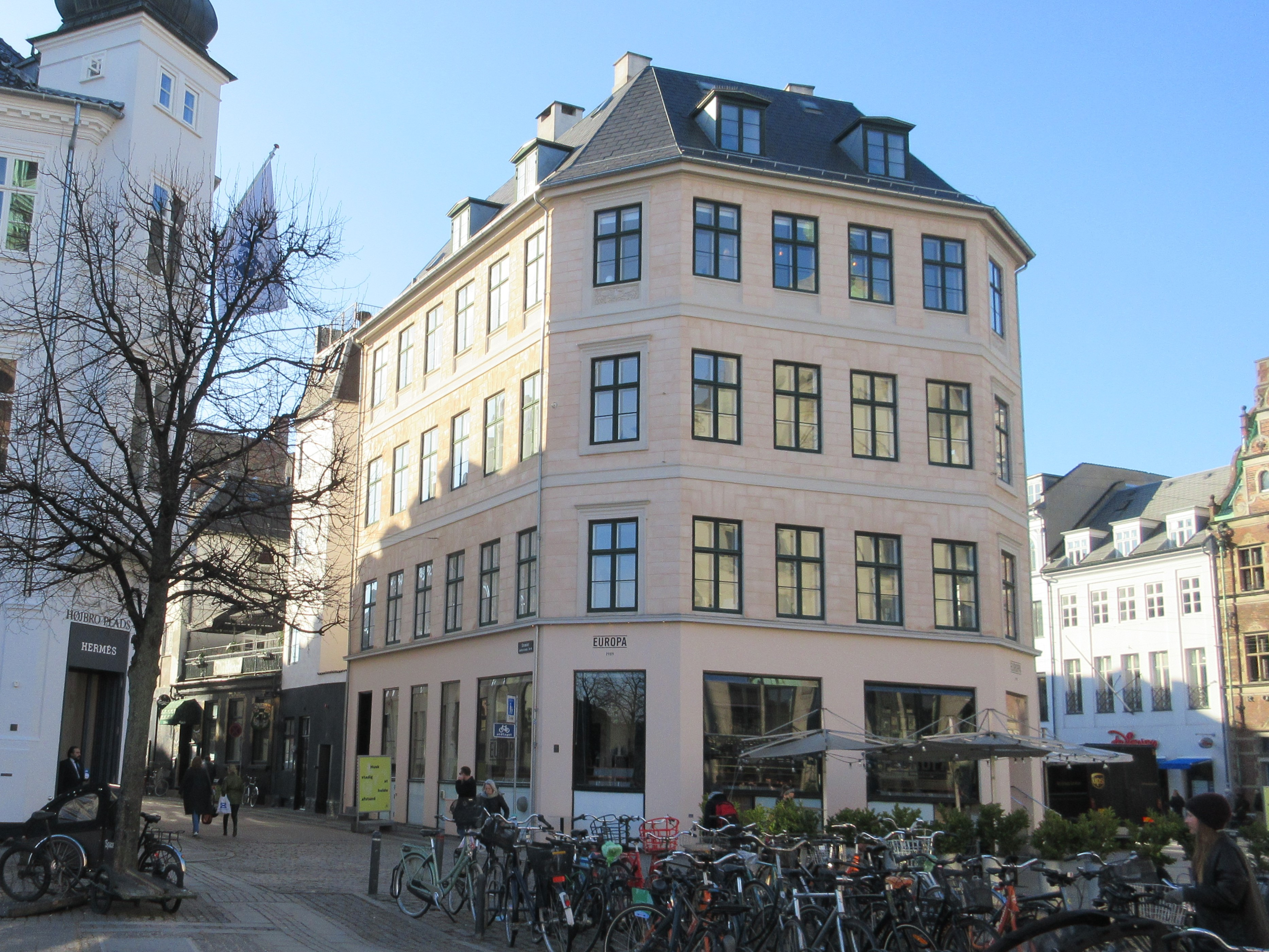
- Interactive map of the Amagertorv 1 area

General information
- Location: Copenhagen, Denmark
- Coordinates: 55°40′43.21″N 12°34′45.44″E
- Completed: 1797
- Renovated: 1854
- Client: Danish Union of Teachers

Amagertorv 1 is a Neoclassical property situated at the corner of Amagertorv and Højbro Plads, opposite Højbrohus, in the Old Town of Copenhagen, Denmark. Constructed in 1797 as part of the rebuilding of the city following the Copenhagen Fire of 1795, it owes its current appearance to a renovation undertaken by Christian Tybjerg in 1854. The building was listed in the Danish registry of protected buildings and places in 1989.

== Architecture ==
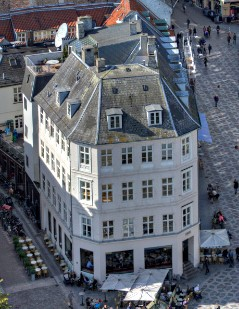
Amagertorv 1 seen from the tower of the former St. Nicolas' Church.

The building is constructed with four storeys over a walk-out basement, It is a three-winged building, surrounding a small central light well, with a five-bays-long facade on Amagertorv, a four-bays-long facade on Højbro Plads and a six-bays-long facade on Læderstræde. The chamfered corner bays were dictated for all corner buildings by Jørgen Henrich Rawert's and Peter Meyn's guidelines for the rebuilding of the city after the fire so that the fire department's long ladder companies could navigate the streets more easily. The rendered peach-coloured facade is finished with shadow joints on the three upper floors. It is divided horizontally by belt courses between the storeys a cornice below the roof. Other decorative elements include rectangular niches with reliefs below the corner windows on the third floor. The main entrance in the central bay towards Amagertorv and the secondary entrance in Læderstræde are both topped by transom windows. The slate-clad roof features six dormer vindows towards the street.
