= Nyhavn 13 =

Building in Copenhagen, Denmark

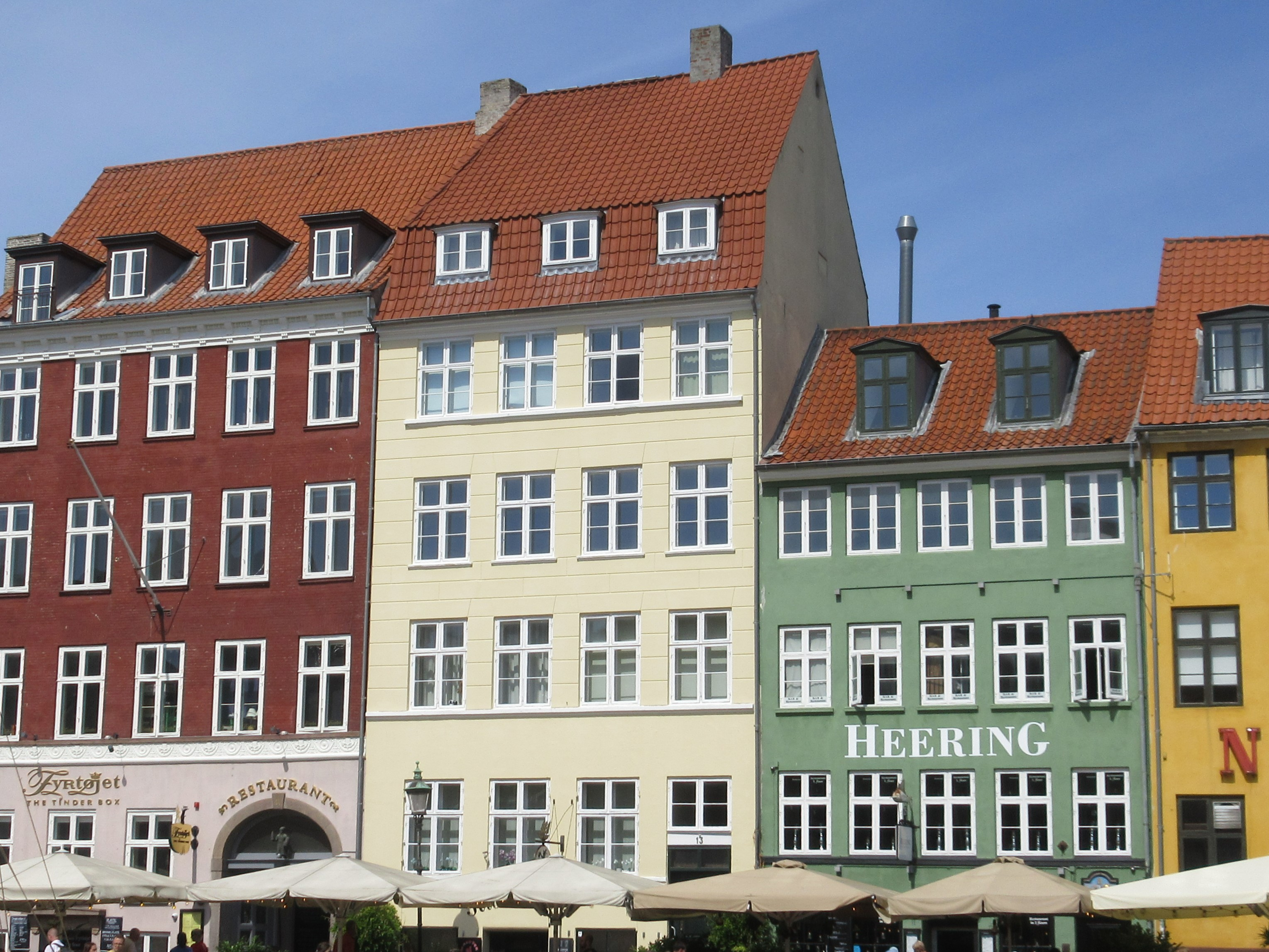
- Nyhavn 13 in August 2024.
- Interactive map of the Nyhavn 13 area

General information
- Location: Copenhagen, Denmark
- Coordinates: 55°40′50.09″N 12°35′19.91″E
- Completed: 1681

Nyhavn 13 is a historic townhouse overlooking the Nyhavn Canal in central Copenhagen, Denmark. With roots dating back to the late 17th century, it owes its current appearance to a heightening of the building with two floors in 1842. Notable former residents include the businessman Abraham Marcus Hirschsprung and the painter and educator Wilhelm Kyhn. The building was listed in the Danish registry of protected buildings and places in 1945.
