= Ugeskrift for Læger =

- Discipline: General medical
- Language: Danish

Publication details
- History: 1839–present
- Frequency: Weekly

Standard abbreviations
- ISO 4: Ugeskr. Læg.

Indexing
- ISSN: 1399-4174 (print); 0041-5782 (web)

Links
- Journal homepage

Ugeskrift for Læger (English: Weekly Journal for Physicians) is a Danish medical journal published every Monday. It is written in Danish, and publishes original research, news, debate, job ads, etc. The journal was established in 1839 and has been available online since 1999.
