= Rosengårdcentret =

Shopping centre in Odense, Denmark

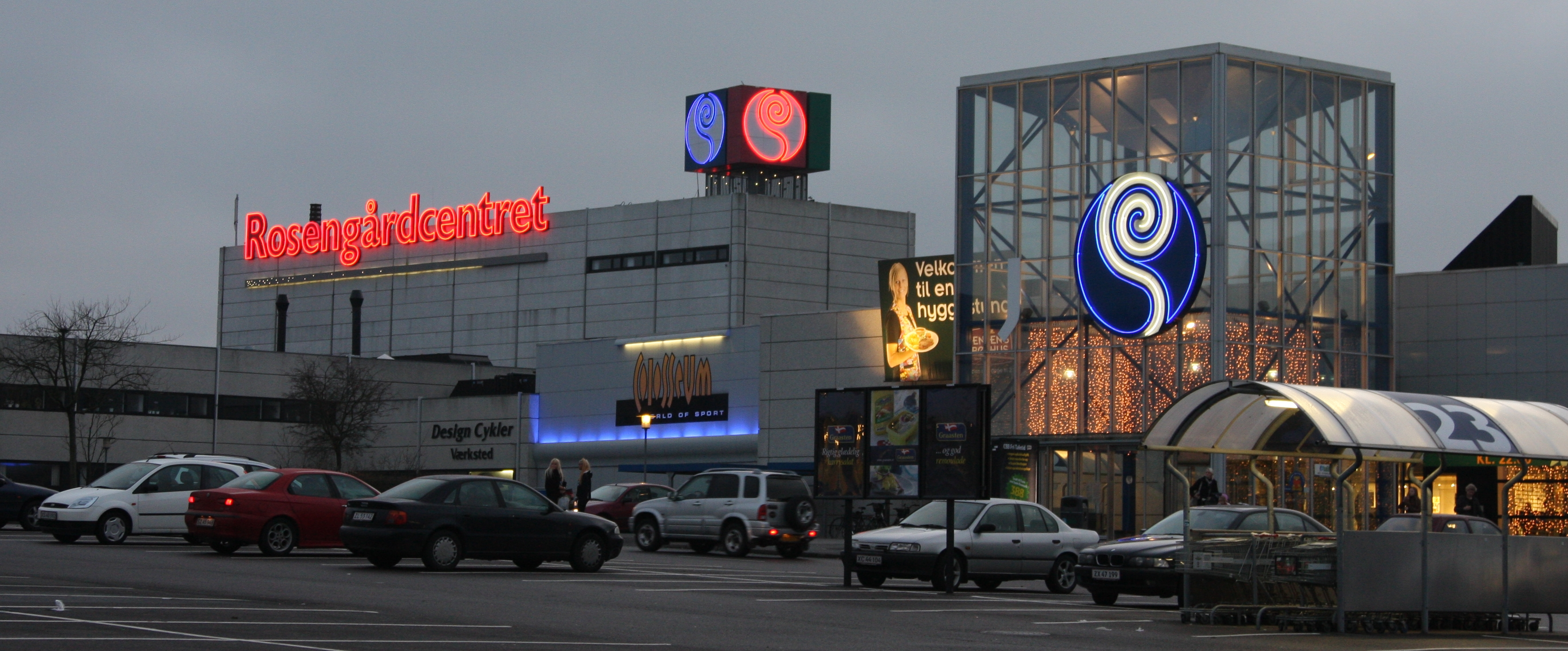
- Rosengårdcentret in 2009
- Coordinates: 55°23′00″N 10°25′34″E
- Opened: May 25, 1971; 55 years ago
- Owner: ECE Projektmanagement
- Num. of stores: 143
- Floor area: 144,000 m^{2} (1,550,000 sq ft)
- Parking: 3000 spaces
- Website: rosengaardcentret.dk

Rosengårdcentret is a shopping centre located in Odense on the Danish island of Funen. The mall dates from 1971 and is the largest in Denmark with 144,000 m^{2} (1,550,000 sq ft) of floor space and more than 150 stores as well as restaurants, a cinema and a fitness centre.
