= Gunni Busck =

Danish businessman

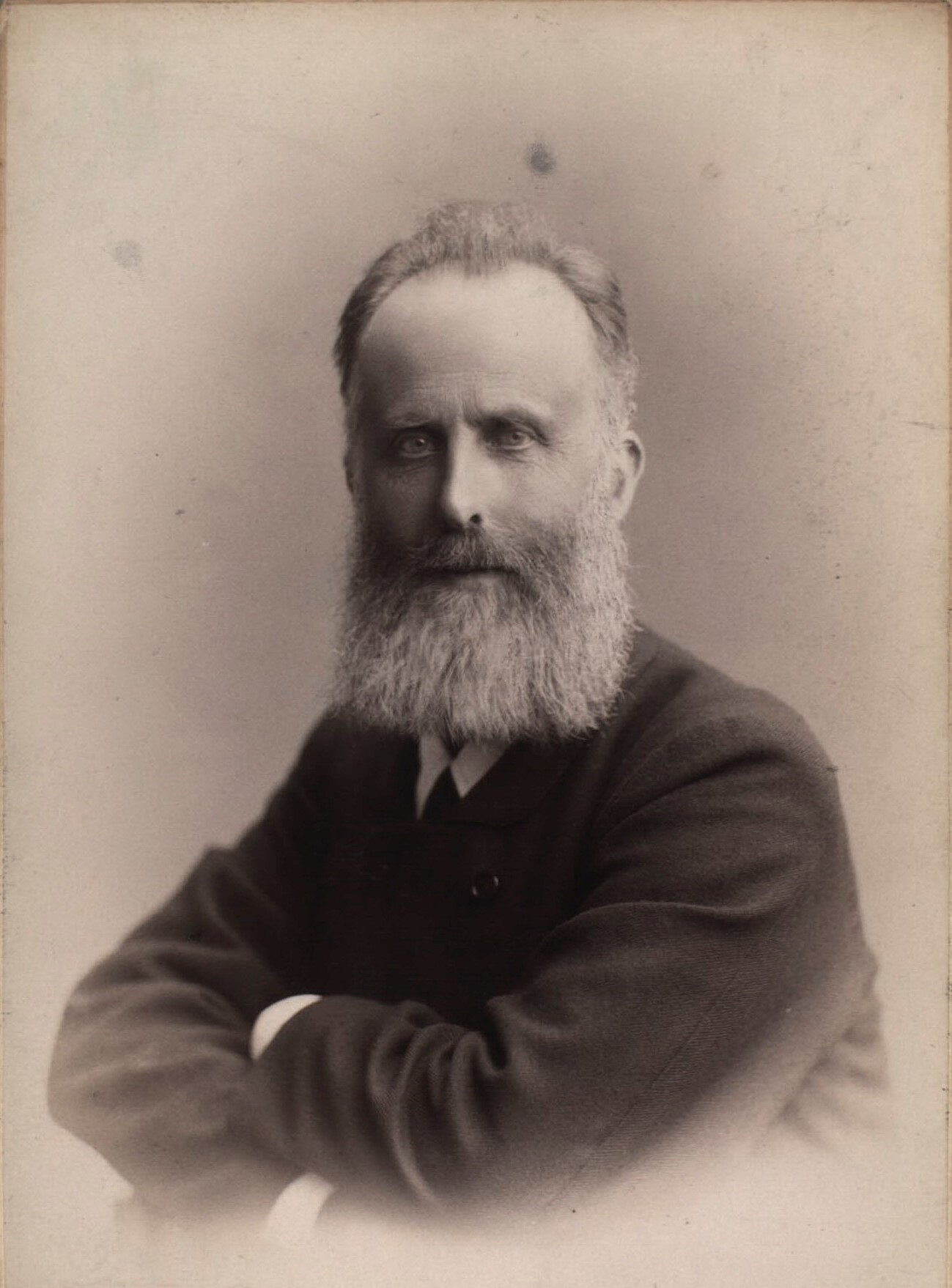
Gunni Busck

Gunni Busck (9 June 1840 – 20 March 1920) was a Danish businessman. He was a founder of the Scandinavian Preserved Butter Company and Københavns Mælkeforsyning. He was the paternal uncle of bookdealer Arnold Busck.

== Early life and education ==
Busck, born on June 9, 1840, in Roskilde, was the son of farmer August Busck (1806–1869) and Johanne Marie Secher (1801–1882). His ambition was to become a medical doctor, but unfortunately, he had to abandon his studies due to illness at a young age.

== Career ==
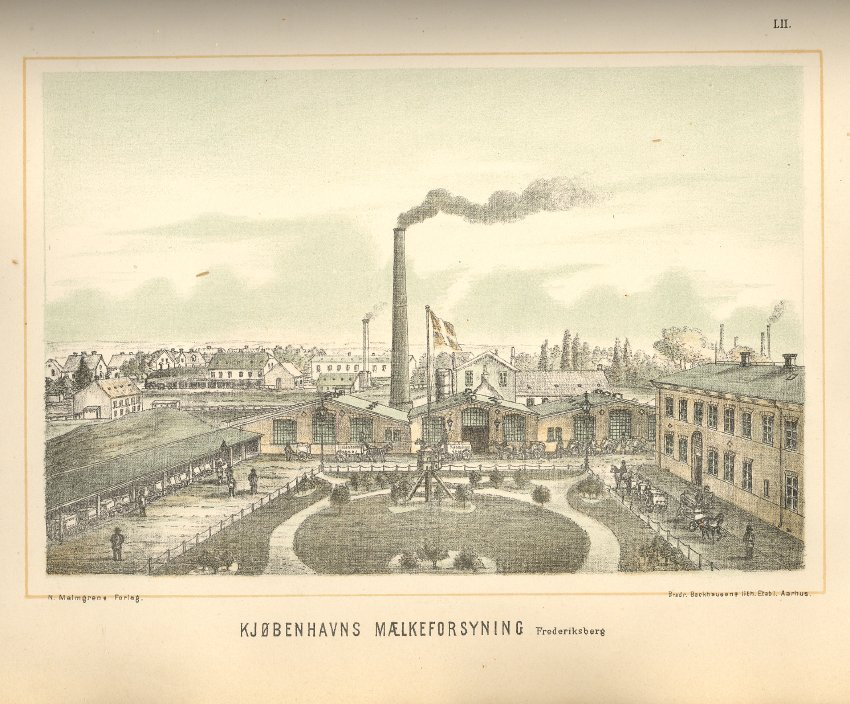
Kjøbenhavns Mælkeforsyning, c. 1888

Busck was licensed as a businessman (grosserer) in Copenhagen in 1862 and engaged in the export of sweetened, canned butter to the tropics. The company was in 1874 converted into a limited company (aktieselskab) under the name The Scandinavian Preserved Butter Company, Busck jun. & Co. with Busck as managing director. He founded a cooperative dairy in Slagelse the following year, which over the next few years won a reputation for its experiments and education of labour for the dairy industry.

In 1878, Busck was the founder of Københavns Mælkeforsyning. With its high standards for sanitary installations, quality control and supervision of livestock, it became a model for similar ventures in other Danish towns as well as abroad. A new factory was in 1884 inaugurated at Mælkevej (now Nyelandsvej) No. 25 in Frederiksberg. He also established Solbjerg Dairy at a neighbouring site.

He retired from the butter company in 1915 and both Københavns Mælkeforsyning and Solbjerg Dairy were sold to Det Danske Mælke-Compagni in 1916.

== Personal life ==
Busck married Charlotte Ann Hutchinson (14 May 1838 – 4 August 1921), a daughter of timber merchant and Swedish-Norwegian vice-consul in Leith Thomas H. and Isabella Wight (c. 1810–95), on 4 January 1887 in Edinburgh. His brother, Theodor Busck, who was principal of Duebrødres Kloster in Roskilde, was the father of bookdealer Arnold Busck.

He purchased the townhouse at Ny Kongensgade 3 in 1877. He was created a Knight in the Order of the Dannebrog in 1887. He died on 20 March 1920 in Frederiksberg and is buried at Assistens Cemetery.
