= Læderstræde 36 =

Listed buildings in Copenhagen

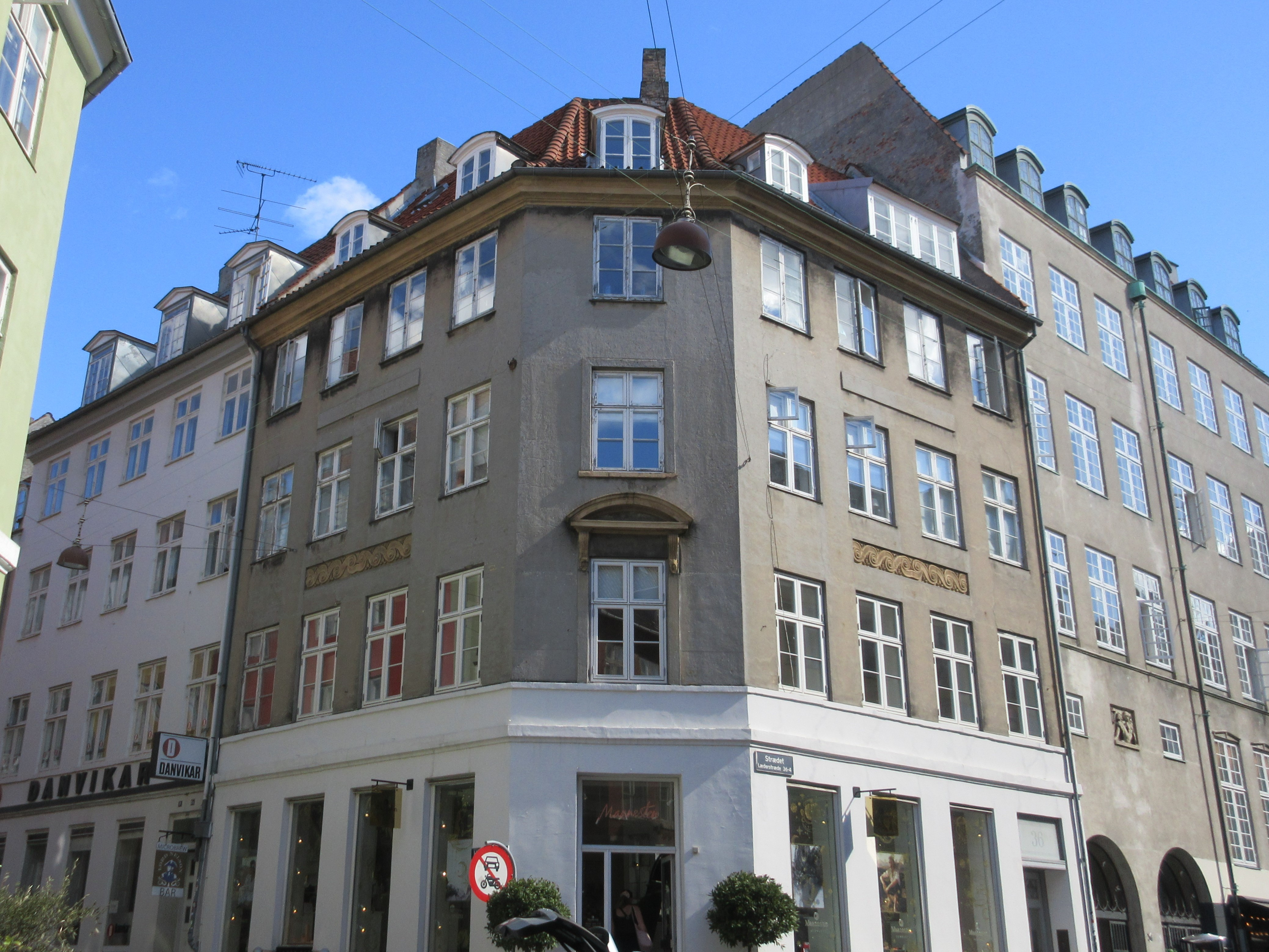
- Interactive map of the Læderstræde 36 area

General information
- Architectural style: Neoclassical
- Location: Copenhagen, Denmark
- Coordinates: 55°40′40.37″N 12°34′37.2″E
- Completed: 1799

Læderstræde 36 is a Neoclassical building situated at the corner of Læderstræde and Hyskenstræde in the Old Town of Copenhagen, Denmark. The property was for around 100 years, from 1722 until some time after 1806 the site of a distillery. The adjacent building Hyskenstræde 9 was part of the same property until 1845. The two buildings were both constructed as part of the rebuilding of the city following the Copenhagen Fire of 1795, although the building in Hyskenstræde was subject to comprehensive alterations in 1834. The two buildings were individually listed in the Danish registry of protected buildings and places in 1964.

== Architecture ==
Læderstræde 36, is a four story building. The chamfered corner bay was dictated for all corner buildings by Jørgen Henrich Rawert's and Peter Meyn's guidelines for the rebuilding of the city after the fire so that the fire department's long ladder companies could navigate the streets more easily. The facade s towards both streets feature a friezes with Vitruvian schroll ornamentation between the two central windows of the first and second floors. The first-floor corner window is topped by a segmental pediment supported by corbels.

Htskenstræde 0 is constructed with four stories over a walk-out basement. The five-bays-wide plastered facade is finished with a cornice band above the ground floor and a cornice below the roof. The main entrance in the bay furthest to the right is raised three steps from the street level and topped by a transom window. The roof is clad in red tile.
