= Snaregade 12–14 =

Buildings in Copenhagen, Denmark

Snaregade 10
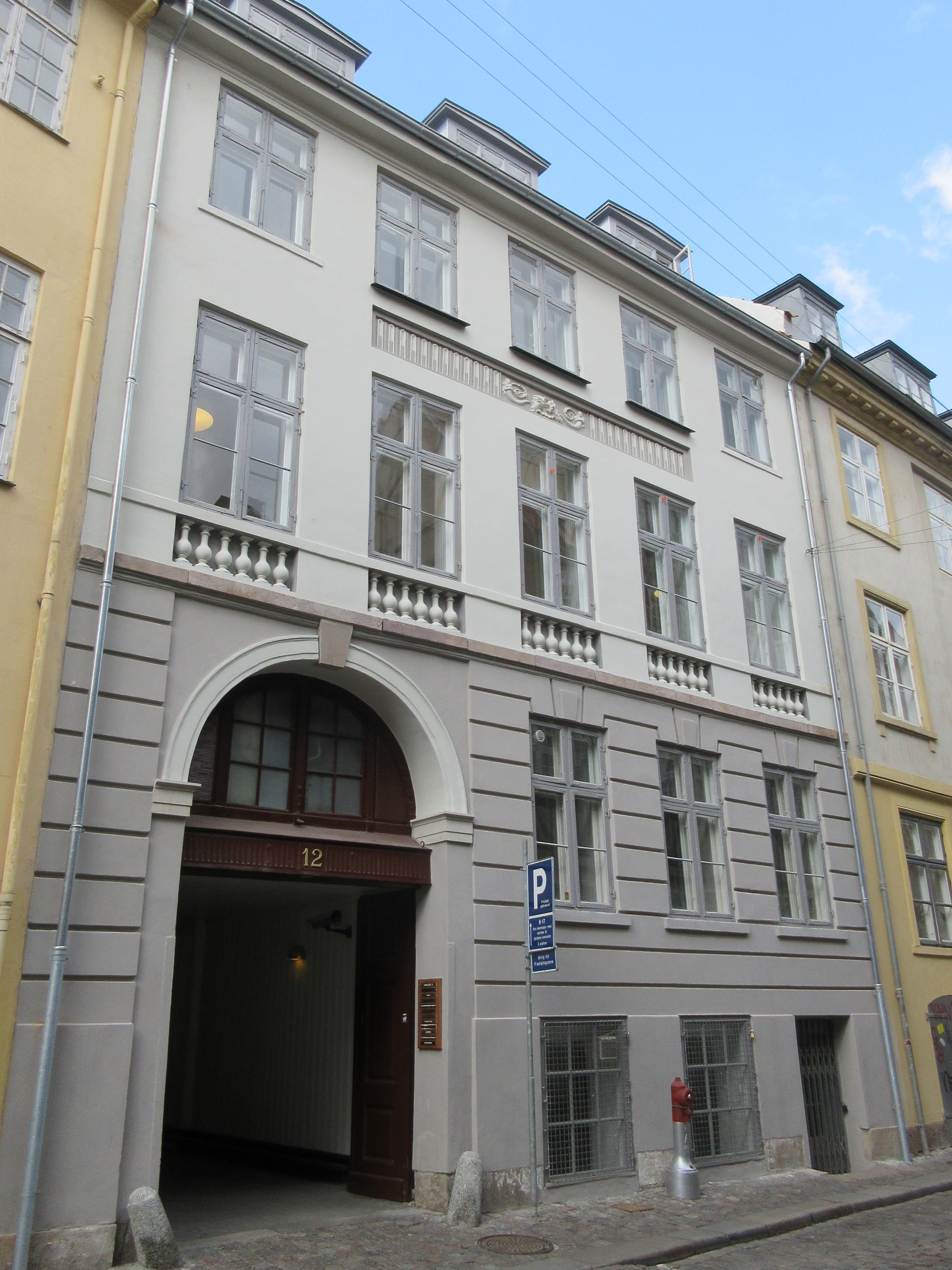
- Interactive map of the Snaregade 10 area

General information
- Location: Copenhagen, Denmark
- Coordinates: 55°40′37.2″N 12°34′34.79″E
- Completed: 1790s

Snaregade 12–14 are two adjoining late 18th-century buildings located close to Gammel Strand in the Old Town of Copenhagen, Denmark. The akvavit manufacturer A. Brøndum & Søn was based at the site from 1840. After its acquisition by De Danske Spritfabrikker in 1894, it was continued as a distillery until 1917; then, it was used by the new owner as a bottling facility and sales office into at least the 1950s. Snaregade 12-14 and a former warehouse at Knabrostræde 23 were jointly listed on the Danish registry of protected buildings and places in 1945. The complex is now owned by Jeudan and used as office space.

== History ==
=== Early history ===
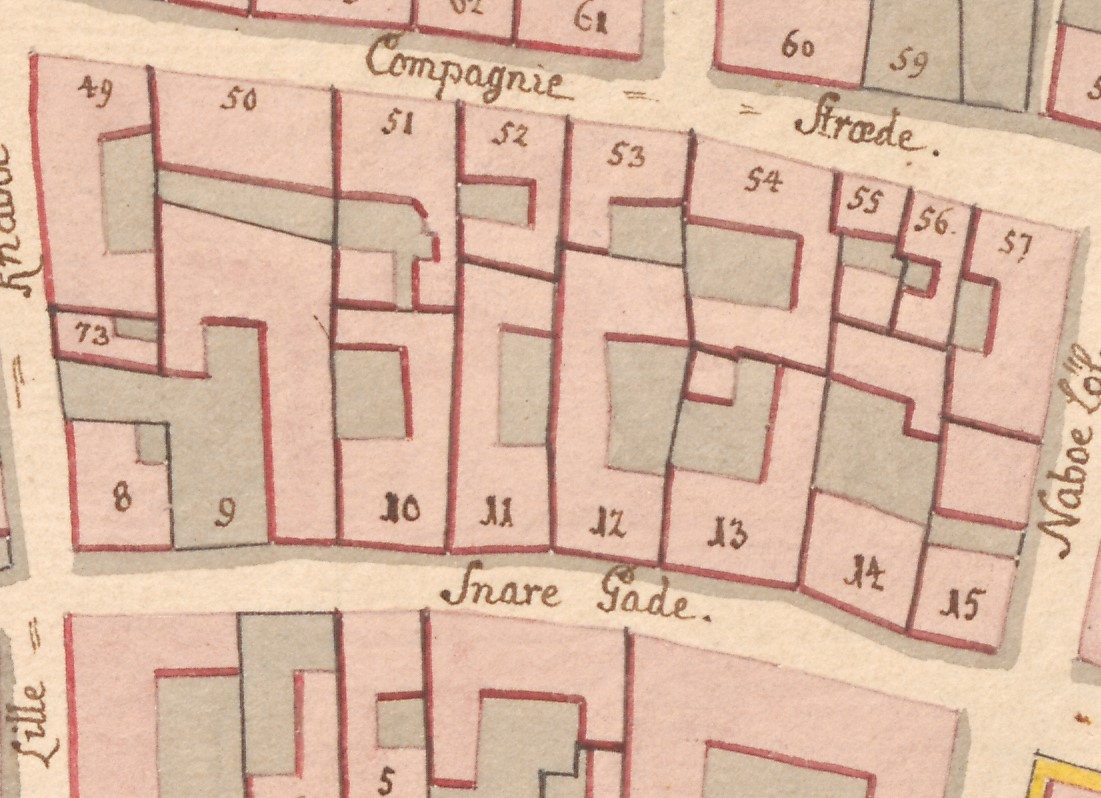
Nos. 9/10 seen on a detail from Christian Gedde's map of Snaren's Quarter, 1757.

Snaregade 12 was listed in Copenhagen's first cadastre of 1689 as No. 12 in Snaren's Quarter and was owned by secretary Søren Rasmussen at that time. The property was listed in the new cadastre of 1756 as No. 10 and belonged to councilman Thomas Ziemmer. Snaregade 14 was part of two properties in 1689 (No. 67 and No. 11). It was listed in the new cadastre of 1756 as No. 8 and belonged to captain Henrik Fester,

The two properties were both destroyed in the Copenhagen Fire of 1795. The fire came from the east and stopped just a few houses further to the west at Knabrostræde. Snaregade No. 12 was built in 1796–97 for Moses Bendix I. Davidsen. No. 14 was built in 1795–98 for grocer (hørkræmmer) Andreas Christen Lund. Both buildings were constructed by master builder Michael Bälckow. The warehouse at Knabrostræde 23 was built in 1810–13 for brewer H. Nissen.

No. 10 was home to 35 residents in five households at the time of the 1801 census. Moses Bendix, a Jewish merchant, resided in the building with his wife Buna Tomar and their five children (aged one to 13). Ellen Tomar (née Davids), Bendix's mother-on-law, resided in another apartment with a 21-year-old office clerk and two maids. David Abraham Tomar, Bendix's brother-in-law and also a merchant, resided in another apartment with his wife Rachel Mosis, their six children (aged five to 11), an office clerk and a maid. Andreas Peterson, a merchant (grosserer), resided in the building with his wife Ellen Petersen, their one-year-old daughter, his sister-in-law Margrethe Peterson (widow of his late brother) and her three children (aged seven to 13), a wet nurse and a maid. Søren Michelsen, a beer seller (øltapper), resided in the basement with his wife Ane Marie Olsen, their two-year-old son and two maids.

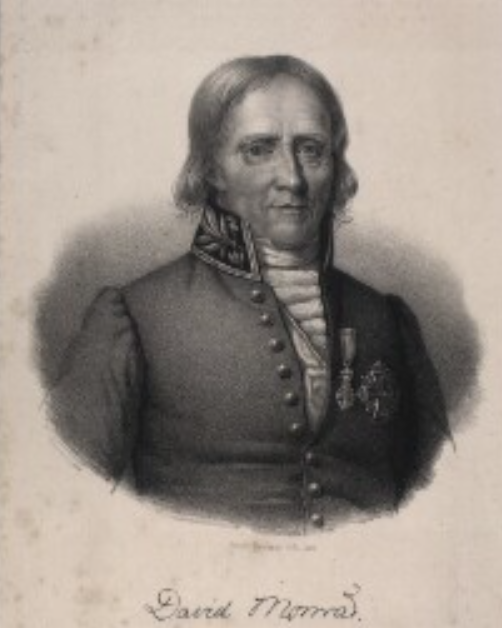
David Monrad

No. 9 was home to 21 residents at the 1801 census. Andreas Christensen Lund, a brewer, resided in the building with his wife Johanne Børs, their 27-year-old son, a 15-year-old lodger, a brewer's apprentice, a caretaker and a maid. Benjamin Bithorn, a merchant (grosserer), resided in the building with his wife Henriette Seidelitz, an office clerk, an apprentice, a caretaker and a maid. David Monrad, an official with title of kancelliråd, resided in the building with his wife Clara Jørgensen, their four children (aged one to six), a lodger and two maids.

The clergy and writer A. G. Rudelbach (1792–1862) was in 1823 among the residents at No. 14. The lawyer and politician Otto Liebe (1820–1900) resided at No. 14 from 1843 to 1849. The architect N. S. Nebelong (1806–1871) was among the residents in 1852–53. At the time of the 1860 census, No. 12 was home to a total of 20 people. Ane Christine Dauter operated a boarding houe on one of the floors. The other residents included a master wheelwright, a smith and a colonel with their respective families.

=== A. Brøndum & Søn ===
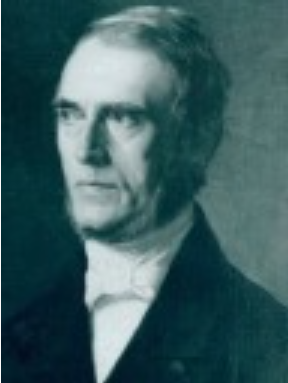
Anton Christian Brøndum

Anton Brøndum (1806 - 1869) started a distillery on the site in 1840. He was the son of the prominent distiller Christen Brøndum and had for the past ten years been the proprietor of the father's old distillery in Pilestræde. Brøndum's distillery expanded to the building next door and would continue to expand into several other properties over the following years. In 1853, he also constructed the large residential property at Fredericiagade 36 in the other end of the city. In 1858, he took his son Alfred G. Brøndum (1840–1893) as a partner to become A. Brøndum & Søn.

A. Brøndum & Søn was by Alfred Brøndum's widow Emma (née Lorentzen) one year after her husband's death sold to De Danske Spritfabrikker. In 1902, Kompagnistræde was demolished to make way for a new building on the other side of the block. The complex was decommissioned as a distillery in 1917 but remained in use as a bottling facility and sales office at least into the 1950s.

=== Later history ===
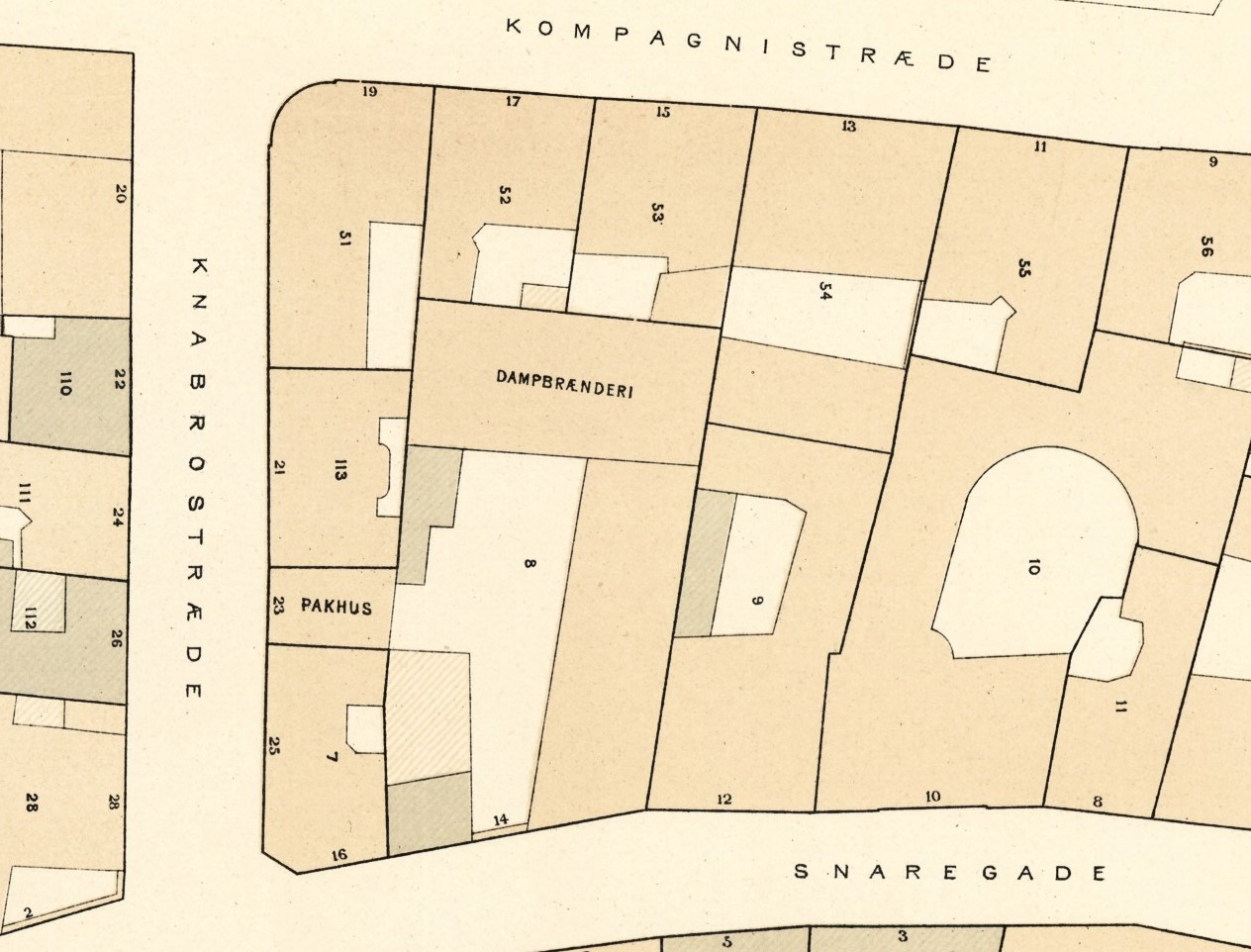
Snaregade 12-14 seen on a detail from Berggreen's cadastral map of Snaren's Quarter, 1884.

The complex was later acquired by Atlas Ejendommem later renamed Landic Property Denmark A/S, In October 2009, Jeudan acquired Landic Property Denmark's portfolio of 32 properties, including Snaregade 12–15, for DKK 2 billion.

== Architecture ==
Snaregade 12 consists of three storeys over a raised cellar. The building has rusticated finishing on the ground storey, blind balustrades under the windows on the first storey and a decorative relief frieze under the three central windows of the second storey.

== Gallery ==
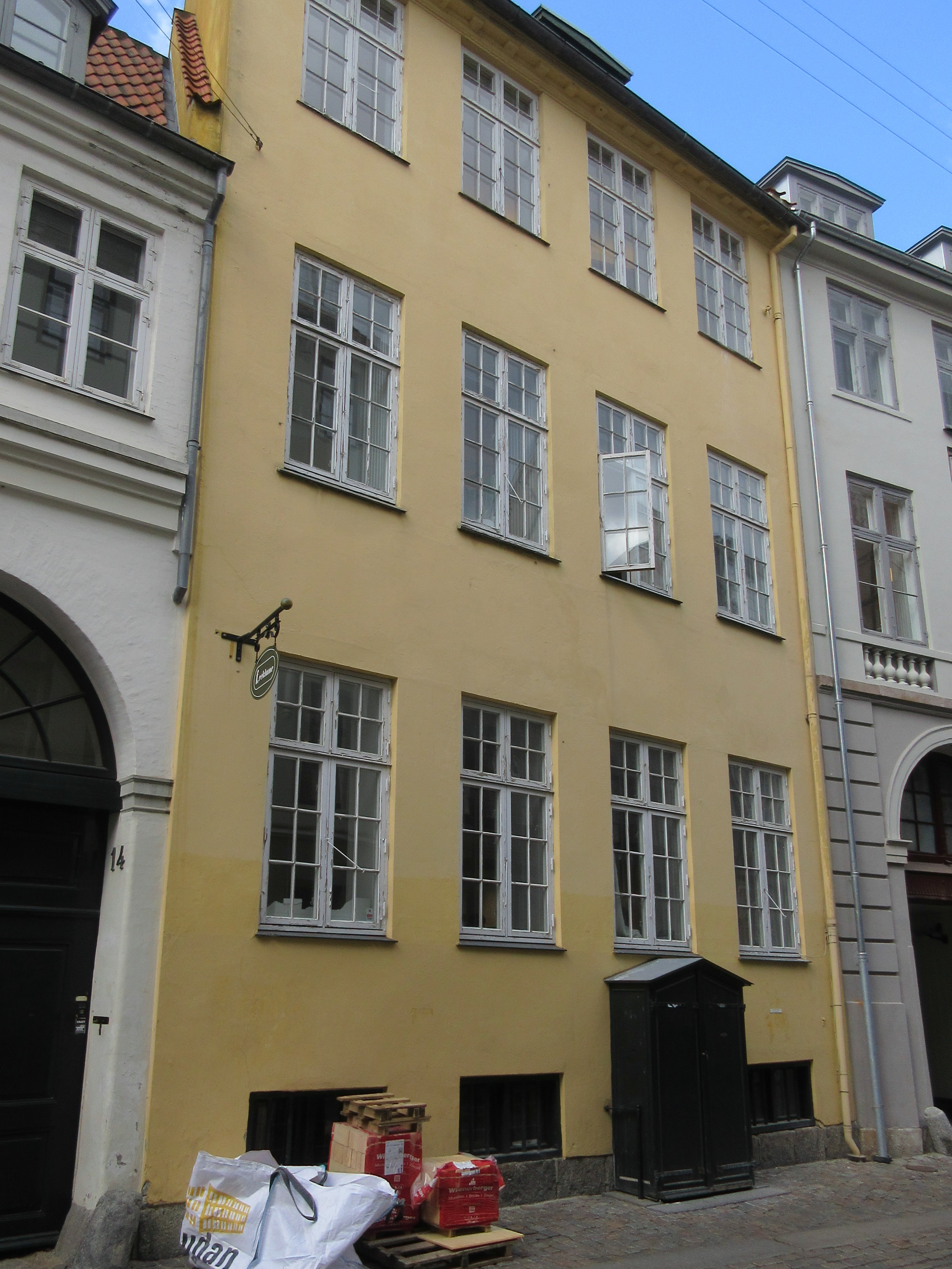
Snaregade 14

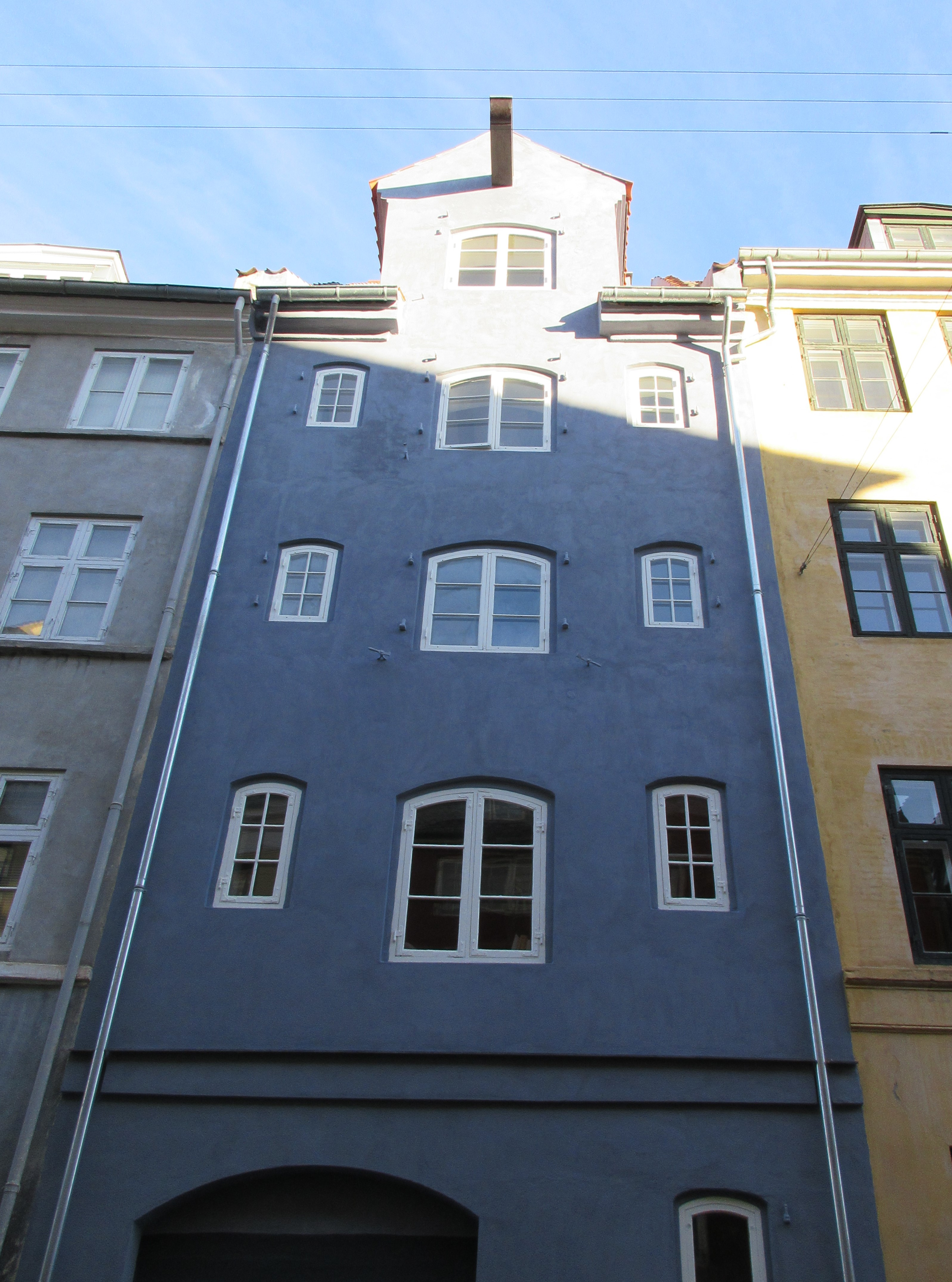
Knabrostræde 23

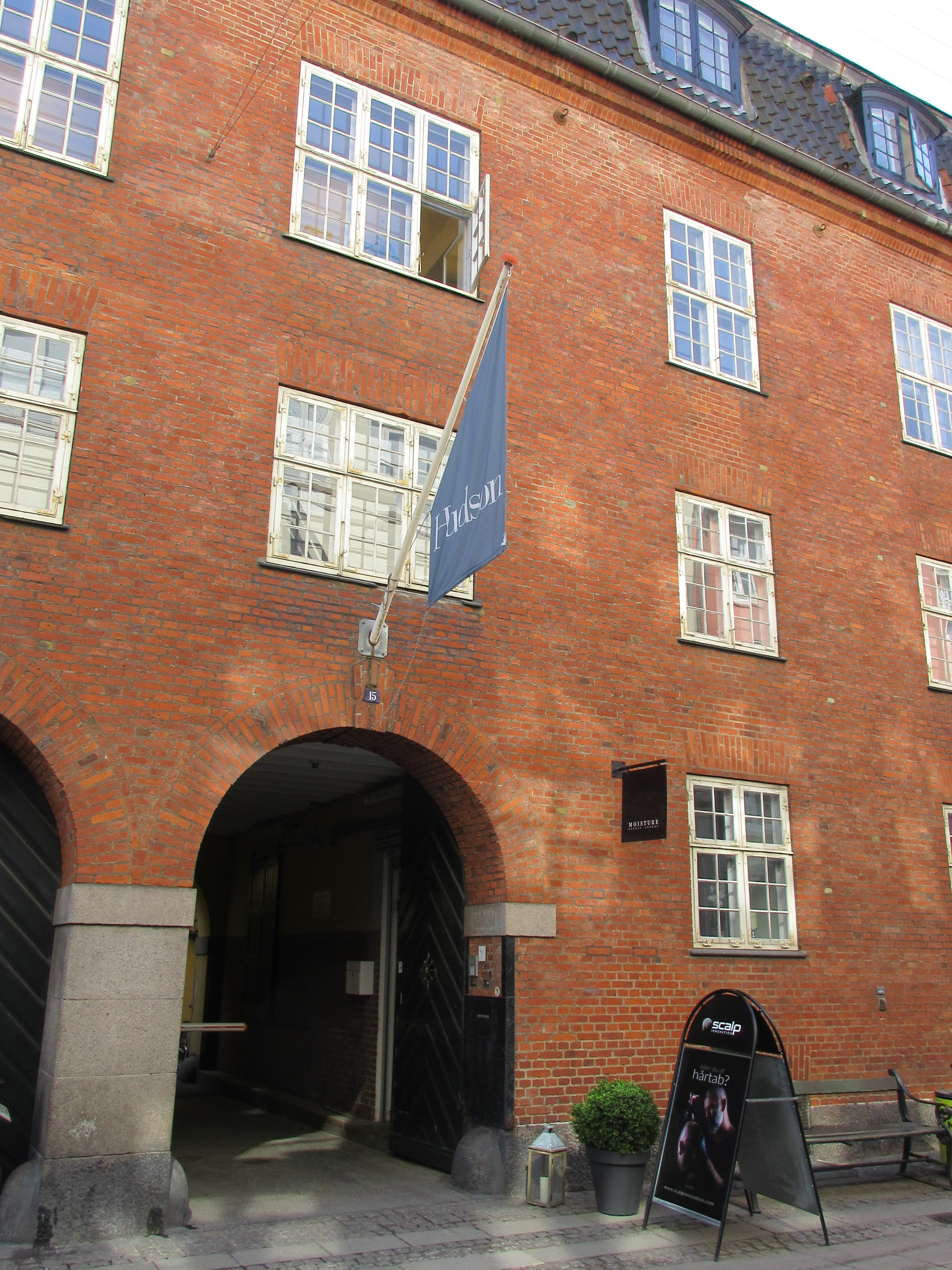
Kompagnistræde 13

== Today ==
Snaregade 12-14. Knabrostræde 19, Knabrostræde 23 and Kompagnistræde 13-15 are owned by Jeudan. The tenants include Zendesk (Snaregade 12) and Norm Architects (Snaregade 14).
