= Københavns Mælkeforsyning =

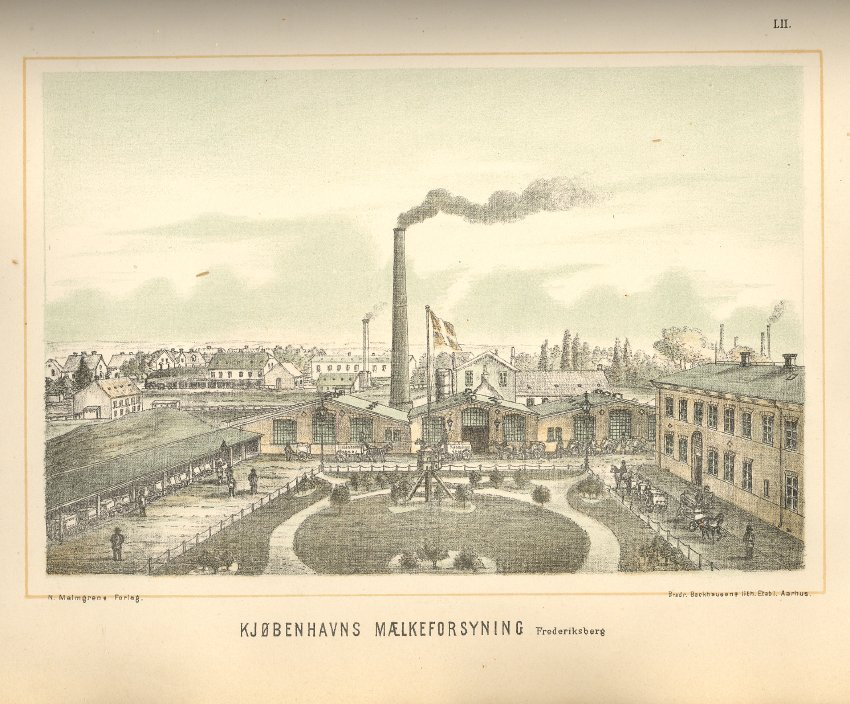
Kjøbenhavns Mælkeforsyning, c. 1888

Københavns Mælkeforsyning was a Danish dairy products company based in Copenhagen, Denmark.

== History ==
Kjøbenhavns Mælkeforsyning was founded as a milk processing and distribution company in 1878 by Gunni Busck and Erhard Frederiksen. Busck was already the owner of the Scandinavian Preserved Butter Company as well as Slagelse Dairy. Frederiksen was the first managing director of the company but was after approximately one year succeeded by Busck. Supreme court attorney Herman Barclay Halkier was a board member of the new company and Peter Ludvig Panum was responsible for quality control of the milk. The enterprise was initially based in small premises in Besterbro but grew rapidly and a new factory was after five years inaugurated at a site next to the railway on Mælkevej (Milk Road, now Nyelandsvej) in Frederiksberg. The milk arrived by rail from farms in the surrounding countryside and was then cooled and bottled before being distributed. The company had around 100 employees and 40 wagons for distributing the milk.

The company had several subsidiaries, including Mælkeriet i Tivoli, Hørsholm Mælkekompagni and Solbjerg Fløde-Is.

=== 1920s acquisition by Danske Mælke-Compagni ===
The company was acquired by Det Danske Mælke-Compagni in 1916. The company's old buildings were replaced by new ones in the 1920s and it developed into one of the largest employers in Frederiksberg. The company was for a while headed by Henrik Tholstrup.

The milk trains continued operating until the 1950s but was then replaced by road transportation. Københavns Mælkeforsyning closed in the mid-1970s.

== See also ==
- Enigheden
