= Store Magleby Church =

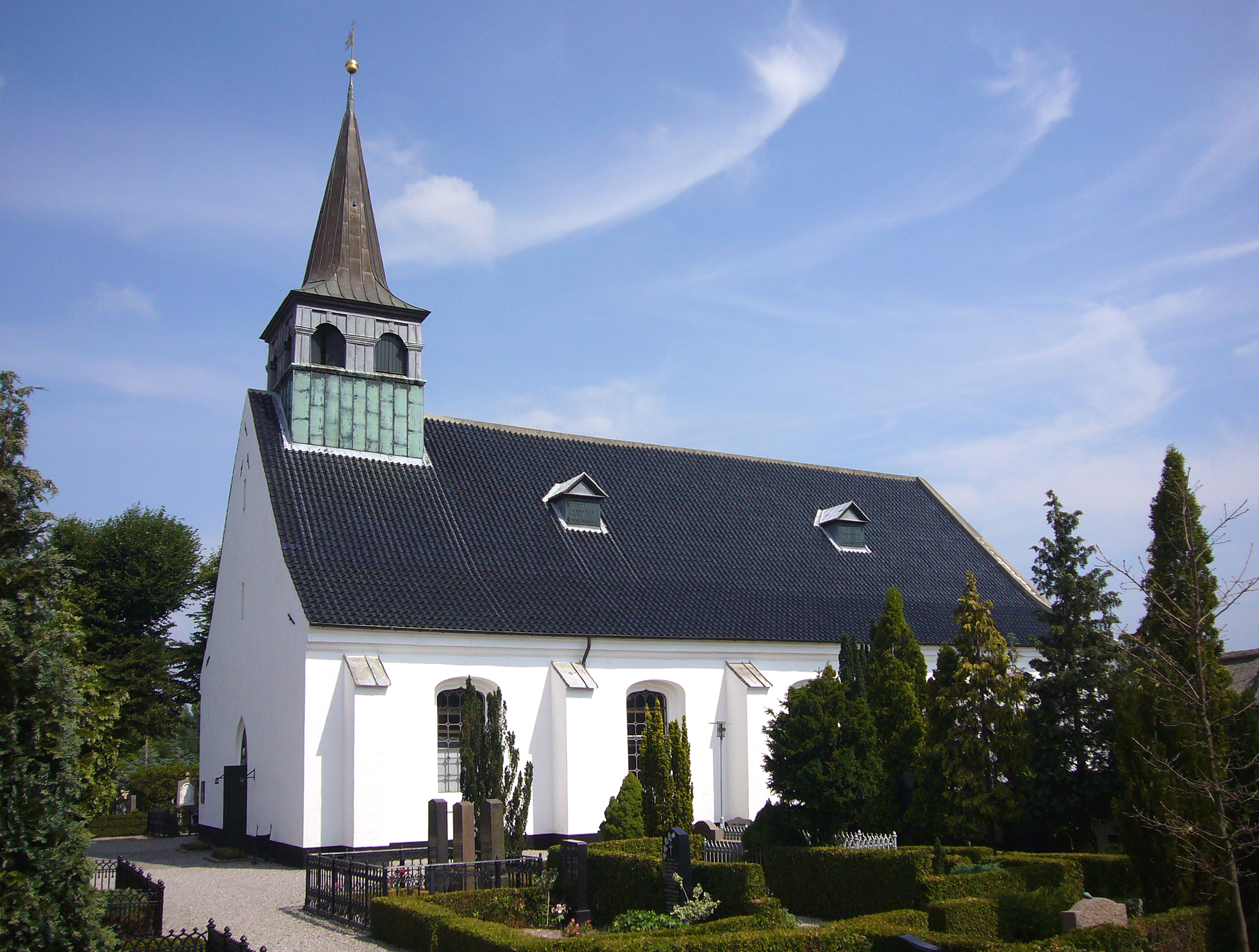
- Store Magleby Church
- 55°35′45″N 12°38′10″E
- Location: 2 Kirkevej; 2791 Dragør
- Country: Denmark
- Denomination: Church of Denmark

History
- Status: Church

Architecture
- Architectural type: Church
- Completed: 1731

Administration
- Archdiocese: Diocese of Copenhagen

Store Magleby Church (Danish: Store Magleby Kirke) is a church in Store Magleby, now part of Dragør, on the southern part of Amager in the outskirts of Copenhagen, Denmark.

== History ==
Store Magleby Church was originally built some time between 1193 and 1370. King Christian gave it to the Dutch farmers who had settled on Amager. They renovated and expanded the church in 1611.

== Architecture ==
The current appearance of the church dates from 1731 when it underwent major alterations. The longhouse nave is 36 metres long and 16 metres wide and is terminated by a three-sided chancel to the east while a flèche tops the roof to the west.

== Interior ==
The stucco decorations, altarpiece, and pews all date from the 1850s. The altarpiece's original painting by Thomas Wagner from 1860 was replaced by a Eucharist painting by Thomas Kluge in 2012. The remains of a catechism altarpiece from 1580 is seen on the north wall.
