= List of cities and towns in Denmark =

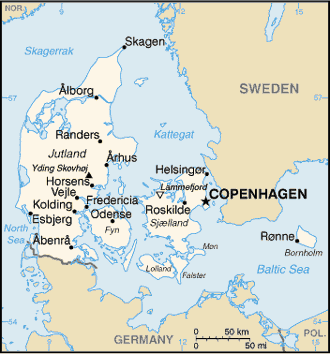
Map of Denmark

This article shows a list of cities in Denmark by population. The population is measured by Statistics Denmark for urban areas (Danish: Byområder), defined as a contiguous built-up area with a maximum distance of 200 meters between houses, unless further distance is caused by public areas, cemeteries or similar. Furthermore, to obtain the status of being a city (byområde), the area must have at least 200 inhabitants. Smaller settlements are by Danmarks Statistik included in numbers for rural areas (landdistrikter).

== List ==
Danish urban areas with a population of 2,500 or more as per 1 January 2023
#	Urban area	2012	2013	2014	2015	2016	2017	2018	2019	2020	2021	2022	2023	+/- (Note: Percentage change from 2012 to 2023.)
1	Copenhagen metropolitan area (Note: The metropolitan area includes: Copenhagen, Frederiksberg, Albertslund, Brøndby, Gentofte, Gladsaxe, Glostrup, Herlev, Hvidovre, Lyngby-Taarbæk, Rødovre, Tårnby and Vallensbæk municipalities, Ishøj town and Greve Strand as well as parts of Ballerup and the former Søllerød and Værløse municipalities.)	1,213,822	1,230,728	1,246,611	1,263,698	1,280,371	1,295,686	1,308,893	1,320,629	1,330,993	1,336,982	1,345,562	1,363,296	+12.3%
2	Aarhus	252,213	256,018	259,754	261,570	264,716	269,022	273,077	277,086	280,534	282,910	285,273	290,598	+15.2%
3	Odense	168,798	170,327	172,512	173,814	175,245	176,683	178,210	179,601	180,302	180,760	180,863	182,387	+8.1%
4	Aalborg (Note: From 1 January 1981 to 31 December 2005, Nørresundby was included in Aalborg. On 1 January 2006, the urban area definition was introduced and Aalborg's and Nørresundby's population numbers are again calculated separately.)	104,885	106,916	109,092	110,495	112,194	113,417	114,194	115,908	117,351	119,219	119,862	120,914	+15.3%
5	Esbjerg	71,579	71,491	71,618	72,060	72,151	72,261	72,398	72,168	72,037	72,044	71,698	71,921	+0.5%
6	Randers	61,121	60,895	61,163	61,664	62,342	62,563	62,687	62,586	62,482	62,623	62,802	64,057	+4.8%
7	Horsens	54,450	55,253	55,884	56,536	57,517	58,480	58,646	59,181	59,449	59,966	61,074	63,162	+16.0%
8	Kolding	57,540	57,583	58,021	58,757	59,712	60,300	60,508	60,854	61,121	61,222	61,638	62,338	+8.3%
9	Vejle	51,804	52,449	53,230	53,975	54,862	55,876	56,567	57,051	57,655	58,777	60,231	61,310	+18.3%
10	Roskilde	47,828	48,186	48,721	49,297	50,046	50,393	50,781	51,121	51,262	51,793	51,916	52,580	+9.9%
11	Herning	46,873	47,271	47,765	47,911	48,531	49,229	49,716	50,039	50,332	50,531	50,565	51,193	+9.2%
12	Silkeborg	42,807	42,910	43,158	43,351	43,885	44,333	45,126	46,179	46,923	48,369	49,747	50,866	+18.8%
13	Hørsholm	45,865	46,104	46,229	46,717	47,000	47,294	47,489	47,487	47,499	47,869	47,680	47,836	+4.3%
14	Helsingør	46,368	46,474	46,407	46,492	46,829	47,123	47,364	47,346	47,461	47,483	47,257	47,563	+2.6%
15	Næstved	41,857	42,141	42,424	42,588	42,979	43,234	43,508	43,440	43,803	43,890	44,331	44,996	+7.5%
16	Viborg	37,635	38,261	38,572	39,228	39,856	40,371	40,621	40,768	40,778	41,079	41,239	42,234	+12.2%
17	Fredericia	39,797	39,914	39,922	40,046	40,248	40,461	41,044	41,108	40,981	40,814	40,886	41,243	+3.6%
18	Køge	35,295	35,618	35,768	36,424	36,831	36,864	37,040	37,557	37,754	38,155	38,304	38,588	+9.3%
19	Holstebro	34,378	34,711	34,873	35,108	35,392	35,867	36,199	36,442	36,643	36,805	36,489	37,022	+7.7%
20	Taastrup	32,719	32,984	33,121	33,440	33,971	34,154	34,470	34,248	34,364	34,698	35,238	36,193	+10.6%
21	Hillerød	30,570	30,865	31,191	31,519	31,897	32,278	32,698	33,088	33,398	33,703	35,357	36,043	+17.9%
22	Slagelse	32,133	32,126	32,005	32,333	33,000	33,433	33,777	33,871	34,015	34,118	34,636	34,648	+7.8%
23	Holbæk	27,195	27,096	26,942	26,961	27,579	28,134	28,264	28,538	28,833	29,226	29,608	29,960	+10.2%
24	Sønderborg	27,304	27,337	27,434	27,419	27,595	27,826	27,785	27,801	27,841	27,702	27,766	28,137	+3.1%
25	Svendborg	26,897	26,783	26,672	26,804	27,074	27,281	27,324	27,210	27,068	27,054	27,300	27,594	+2.6%
26	Hjørring	24,867	24,982	25,071	25,426	25,626	25,764	25,994	25,815	25,780	25,741	25,644	25,917	+4.2%
27	Nørresundby	21,671	21,728	21,761	22,083	22,478	22,600	22,859	23,108	23,546	23,718	23,736	23,830	+10.0%
28	Ringsted	21,412	21,423	21,620	21,866	22,231	22,490	22,657	22,900	22,898	22,941	23,086	23,498	+9.7%
29	Ølstykke-Stenløse	20,984	21,360	21,545	21,817	21,966	21,635	21,746	22,030	22,003	22,147	22,658	23,130	+10.2%
30	Frederikshavn	23,295	23,309	23,156	23,345	23,402	23,501	23,423	23,296	23,124	22,862	22,672	22,961	-1.4%
31	Haderslev	21,396	21,485	21,574	21,748	21,994	21,955	21,973	22,011	22,101	22,032	22,011	22,182	+3.7%
32	Smørumnedre	19,147	19,296	19,585	19,651	19,737	19,780	19,816	19,925	20,025	20,253	20,657	21,353	+11.5%
33	Birkerød	19,919	20,121	20,186	20,228	20,416	20,578	20,539	20,740	20,823	20,908	20,877	20,853	+4.7%
34	Farum	18,422	18,091	18,335	18,779	19,664	19,967	20,302	20,372	20,345	20,199	20,312	20,317	+10.3%
35	Skive	20,562	20,503	20,505	20,453	20,617	20,683	20,809	20,599	20,573	20,401	20,190	20,176	-1.9%
36	Skanderborg	18,347	18,413	18,506	18,558	18,659	18,849	18,907	19,185	19,525	19,599	19,963	20,079	+9.4%
37	Nyborg	16,577	16,454	16,528	16,752	17,008	17,192	17,164	17,175	17,268	17,415	17,525	17,900	+8.0%
38	Solrød Strand	15,159	15,183	15,381	15,593	15,679	15,941	16,255	16,687	16,860	17,002	17,337	17,382	+14.7%
39	Frederikssund	15,602	15,654	15,725	15,865	16,016	16,186	16,254	16,268	16,337	16,614	16,850	17,135	+9.8%
40	Nykøbing F	16,394	16,354	16,446	16,503	16,618	16,904	16,778	16,770	16,940	16,980	16,911	16,927	+3.3%
41	Lillerød	15,795	15,904	16,007	16,248	16,567	16,793	16,878	16,906	16,732	16,762	16,741	16,836	+6.6%
42	Aabenraa	15,744	15,750	15,814	15,856	15,967	16,153	16,274	16,352	16,425	16,410	16,401	16,685	+6.0%
43	Middelfart	14,762	14,755	14,815	15,008	15,044	15,202	15,246	15,540	15,922	15,986	16,277	16,546	+12.1%
44	Kalundborg	16,303	16,319	16,316	16,343	16,431	16,490	16,523	16,370	16,295	16,268	16,211	16,486	+1.1%
45	Ikast	15,125	15,129	15,231	15,289	15,318	15,462	15,479	15,626	15,662	15,783	15,979	16,215	+7.2%
46	Hedehusene-Fløng	11,345	11,472	11,584	11,720	11,825	11,943	11,990	12,250	12,265	12,874	13,663	14,868	+31.1%
47	Korsør	14,538	14,501	14,369	14,392	14,603	14,702	14,583	14,647	14,608	14,516	14,463	14,418	-0.8%
48	Grenaa	14,206	14,454	14,601	14,618	14,765	14,856	14,654	14,437	14,251	14,194	14,176	14,179	-0.2%
49	Varde	13,416	13,471	13,605	13,771	13,810	13,951	13,949	13,989	14,022	14,117	14,039	14,108	+5.2%
50	Rønne	13,887	13,730	13,568	13,579	13,639	13,723	13,737	13,780	13,772	13,796	13,807	13,798	-0.6%
51	Thisted	13,138	13,067	13,079	13,198	13,250	13,363	13,416	13,423	13,536	13,484	13,461	13,534	+3.0%
52	Værløse	12,842	13,114	13,083	13,124	13,024	13,127	13,070	12,977	12,926	13,022	13,069	13,203	+2.8%
53	Odder	11,355	11,407	11,404	11,561	11,706	11,872	12,093	12,237	12,354	12,397	12,454	12,914	+13.7%
54	Brønderslev	11,895	11,889	12,046	12,171	12,419	12,541	12,598	12,581	12,611	12,522	12,549	12,884	+8.3%
55	Frederiksværk	12,191	12,080	12,029	12,076	12,282	12,368	12,451	12,549	12,694	12,680	12,718	12,815	+5.1%
56	Hedensted-Løsning	11,292	11,389	11,355	11,591	11,656	11,789	11,835	11,896	12,014	12,107	12,220	12,680	+12.3%
57	Nakskov	13,332	13,243	12,866	12,665	12,688	12,758	12,661	12,691	12,707	12,546	12,495	12,456	-6.6%
58	Dragør	11,683	11,874	11,951	11,941	12,042	12,132	12,085	12,124	12,309	12,349	12,401	12,327	+5.5%
59	Haslev	11,201	11,306	11,376	11,407	11,653	11,748	11,880	11,897	11,973	12,040	12,119	12,280	+9.6%
60	Hobro	11,710	11,754	11,736	11,787	11,864	11,917	12,032	12,083	12,130	12,013	12,071	12,191	+4.1%
61	Vordingborg	11,643	11,686	11,747	11,843	11,908	12,014	12,038	12,005	12,032	11,973	11,943	11,957	+2.7%
62	Jyllinge	10,158	10,126	10,101	10,092	10,145	10,207	10,148	10,105	10,197	10,287	10,134	10,701	+5.3%
63	Lystrup	10,380	10,376	10,362	10,341	10,378	10,436	10,477	10,425	10,419	10,392	10,273	10,213	-1.6%
64	Vejen	9,225	9,393	9,518	9,518	9,605	9,707	9,763	9,736	9,853	9,997	10,009	10,206	+10.6%
65	Struer	10,544	10,427	10,261	10,285	10,415	10,375	10,375	10,301	10,303	10,175	10,129	10,112	-4.1%
66	Ringkøbing	9,705	9,718	9,717	9,766	9,890	9,985	9,966	9,958	9,923	9,889	9,894	9,975	+2.8%
67	Humlebæk	9,273	9,252	9,286	9,396	9,601	9,587	9,643	9,657	9,746	9,728	9,758	9,855	+6.3%
68	Grindsted	9,565	9,633	9,663	9,673	9,732	9,719	9,738	9,754	9,782	9,761	9,750	9,771	+2.2%"
69	Beder-Malling (Note: Separate cities up to and including 2012.)	8,066	8,131	8,194	8,325	8,365	8,387	8,452	8,597	8,898	9,034	9,045	9,228	+14.4%
70	Støvring	6,923	7,024	6,988	7,099	7,356	7,516	7,955	8,221	8,554	8,865	9,089	9,190	+32.7%
71	Galten-Skovby	7,895	7,831	7,827	7,959	7,999	8,268	8,462	8,647	8,828	8,997	9,004	9,177	+16.2%
72	Nykøbing M	9,222	9,040	9,031	9,014	9,012	9,135	9,173	9,135	9,134	9,062	9,033	9,068	-1.7%
73	Fredensborg	8,356	8,406	8,382	8,425	8,423	8,519	8,611	8,703	8,769	8,792	8,965	8,960	+7.2%
74	Helsinge	7,854	7,952	8,051	8,104	8,117	8,199	8,229	8,288	8,225	8,343	8,616	8,906	+13.4%
75	Sæby	8,843	8,770	8,803	8,825	8,869	8,841	8,874	8,855	8,871	8,821	8,838	8,836	-0.1%
76	Aars	8,026	8,071	8,105	8,077	8,116	8,246	8,301	8,320	8,465	8,427	8,474	8,657	+7.9%
77	Løgten-Skødstrup	6,687	6,967	7,061	7,335	7,704	7,894	8,003	8,197	8,541	8,619	8,659	8,651	+29.4%
78	Hundested	8,732	8,632	8,579	8,543	8,595	8,588	8,613	8,597	8,616	8,660	8,543	8,520	-2.4%
79	Hørning	7,119	7,119	7,095	7,265	7,441	7,750	8,063	8,165	8,226	8,294	8,395	8,474	+19.0%
80	Ribe	8,187	8,142	8,168	8,126	8,182	8,251	8,259	8,315	8,317	8,287	8,257	8,365	+2.2%
81	Hinnerup	7,230	7,244	7,360	7,534	7,576	7,681	7,808	7,884	7,853	8,012	8,164	8,351	+15.5%
82	Hadsten	7,956	7,968	7,961	8,005	8,028	8,093	8,086	8,134	8,325	8,257	8,254	8,345	+4.9%
83	Nivå	7,954	7,821	7,821	7,801	7,816	8,024	8,048	8,090	8,011	7,991	7,997	8,325	+4.7%
84	Sorø	7,764	7,801	7,845	7,754	7,866	7,927	7,958	7,980	8,005	8,035	7,999	8,271	+6.5%
85	Skjern	7,764	7,756	7,741	7,761	7,770	7,876	7,866	7,823	7,843	7,850	7,862	7,840	+1.0%
86	Svenstrup	6,785	6,912	7,000	7,056	7,190	7,257	7,346	7,366	7,354	7,558	7,650	7,754	+14.3%
87	Tønder	7,685	7,572	7,595	7,543	7,587	7,693	7,672	7,659	7,581	7,491	7,505	7,574	-1.4%
88	Skagen	8,347	8,220	8,198	8,211	8,124	8,088	8,037	8,003	7,845	7,664	7,571	7,547	-9.6%
89	Bjerringbro	7,487	7,509	7,523	7,448	7,461	7,551	7,477	7,494	7,427	7,379	7,437	7,524	+0.5%
90	Brande	6,974	6,980	7,065	7,089	7,138	7,207	7,300	7,307	7,398	7,394	7,449	7,521	+7.8%
91	Vojens	7,666	7,611	7,655	7,650	7,579	7,627	7,575	7,504	7,431	7,412	7,475	7,480	-2.4%
92	Ry	5,618	5,680	5,731	5,828	6,054	6,082	6,149	6,374	6,648	6,886	7,151	7,382	+31.4%
93	Ebeltoft	7,623	7,528	7,468	7,415	7,437	7,430	7,197	7,189	7,167	7,220	7,204	7,289	-4.4%
94	Bramming	7,093	7,095	7,063	7,018	7,073	7,118	7,153	7,077	7,088	7,132	7,111	7,171	+1.1%
95	Billund	6,146	6,155	6,194	6,253	6,277	6,313	6,451	6,593	6,662	6,643	6,725	7,049	+14.7%
96	Hammel	6,929	6,884	6,906	7,011	7,075	7,005	7,078	7,095	6,974	6,927	6,854	7,019	+1.3%
97	Faaborg	7,200	7,249	7,178	7,150	7,178	7,097	7,065	7,049	6,988	6,966	6,944	6,898	-4.2%
98	Lemvig	7,131	7,141	7,031	6,966	6,929	6,936	6,978	6,959	6,895	6,852	6,816	6,827	-4.3%
99	Slangerup	6,779	6,831	6,794	6,729	6,801	6,864	6,855	6,860	6,808	6,791	6,826	6,824	+0.7%
100	Gilleleje	6,482	6,573	6,514	6,494	6,566	6,633	6,611	6,596	6,658	6,662	6,781	6,778	+4.6%
101	Ringe	5,598	5,584	5,693	5,744	5,836	5,851	5,912	6,110	6,179	6,244	6,474	6,607	+18.0%
102	Aabybro	5,435	5,528	5,558	5,681	5,790	5,859	5,850	6,000	6,161	6,274	6,318	6,559	+20.7%
103	Skælskør	6,385	6,418	6,550	6,532	6,510	6,491	6,454	6,470	6,455	6,440	6,472	6,394	+0.1%
104	Børkop	4,796	4,912	4,964	5,152	5,352	5,435	5,488	5,706	5,799	6,071	6,319	6,353	+32.5%
105	Hornslet	5,346	5,398	5,419	5,457	5,532	5,604	5,743	5,812	5,929	6,031	6,171	6,328	+18.4%
106	Assens	6,072	6,017	5,956	6,012	6,110	6,231	6,209	6,155	6,016	6,060	6,050	6,061	-0.2%
107	Kerteminde	5,789	5,880	5,855	5,872	5,963	5,903	5,914	5,898	5,987	6,008	6,042	6,034	+4.2%
108	Rødekro	6,122	6,127	6,123	6,139	6,094	6,088	6,111	6,072	6,026	5,950	5,950	5,972	-2.5%
109	Bellinge	4,493	4,598	4,585	4,611	4,632	4,661	4,763	4,826	4,915	5,202	5,483	5,826	+29.7%
110	Hellebæk-Ålsgårde	5,558	5,549	5,510	5,492	5,510	5,530	5,520	5,499	5,455	5,754	5,790	5,816	+4.6%
111	Nordborg	6,650	6,447	6,191	6,079	5,967	5,970	5,866	5,889	5,831	5,758	5,709	5,759	-13.4%
112	Maribo	6,003	5,936	5,923	5,966	5,890	5,735	5,807	5,830	5,790	5,734	5,722	5,734	-4.5%
113	Nibe	5,047	5,097	5,093	5,143	5,233	5,233	5,249	5,272	5,217	5,302	5,433	5,539	+9.7%
114	Hirtshals	6,140	6,028	5,959	5,879	5,910	5,880	5,857	5,759	5,733	5,636	5,532	5,538	-9.8%
115	Munkebo	5,662	5,660	5,580	5,601	5,629	5,599	5,563	5,576	5,538	5,536	5,571	5,535	-2.2%
116	Hornbæk-Dronningmølle	5,180	5,189	5,193	5,225	5,256	5,257	5,248	5,283	5,334	5,310	5,236	5,387	+4.0%
117	Tune	5,016	5,063	5,101	5,103	5,173	5,250	5,235	5,256	5,280	5,226	5,300	5,347	+6.6%
118	Otterup	4,927	4,999	4,958	4,978	5,083	5,132	5,120	5,218	5,229	5,227	5,269	5,258	+6.7%
119	Kjellerup	4,797	4,866	4,889	4,928	5,016	5,095	5,089	5,090	5,119	5,034	5,064	5,223	+8.9%
120	Fensmark	4,976	4,961	4,904	4,968	4,969	4,977	5,042	5,049	5,061	5,046	5,110	5,217	+4.8%
121	Mårslet	4,530	4,772	4,810	4,877	4,881	4,905	5,007	5,043	5,036	5,014	5,004	5,162	+14.0%
122	Klarup	4,413	4,499	4,608	4,640	4,678	4,714	4,675	4,733	4,779	4,830	4,969	5,158	+16.9%
123	Nykøbing S	5,144	5,096	5,139	5,195	5,243	5,229	5,194	5,166	5,095	5,041	5,002	5,049	-1.8%
124	Strøby Egede	3,907	3,951	4,000	4,009	4,096	4,201	4,408	4,413	4,532	4,578	4,654	4,984	+27.6%
125	Hadsund	4,994	4,912	4,883	4,913	4,869	4,857	5,003	5,051	4,971	4,943	4,973	4,983	-0.2%
126	Strib	4,348	4,425	4,449	4,456	4,492	4,526	4,675	4,712	4,766	4,817	4,872	4,858	+11.7%
127	Vamdrup	5,064	5,023	5,022	4,993	4,957	4,970	4,927	4,924	4,869	4,844	4,809	4,836	-4.5%
128	Borup	4,190	4,228	4,428	4,497	4,608	4,628	4,633	4,672	4,647	4,699	4,728	4,833	+15.3%
129	Vodskov	4,374	4,295	4,371	4,456	4,381	4,292	4,398	4,541	4,566	4,603	4,663	4,821	+10.2%
130	Viby S	4,537	4,584	4,591	4,609	4,581	4,659	4,636	4,627	4,667	4,727	4,773	4,814	+6.1%
131	Solbjerg	3,270	3,446	3,505	3,551	3,646	3,765	3,973	4,218	4,466	4,550	4,240	4,710	+44.0%
132	Give	4,501	4,518	4,507	4,516	4,536	4,603	4,610	4,600	4,569	4,509	4,550	4,682	+4.0%
133	Rudkøbing	4,646	4,547	4,537	4,513	4,529	4,586	4,671	4,630	4,565	4,530	4,521	4,622	-0.5%
134	Brørup	4,457	4,511	4,455	4,511	4,594	4,583	4,573	4,535	4,521	4,602	4,516	4,593	+3.1%
135	Sejs-Svejbæk	3,913	3,946	3,946	4,015	4,095	4,148	4,198	4,298	4,309	4,455	4,581	4,593	+17.4%
136	Sakskøbing	4,708	4,565	4,539	4,519	4,541	4,545	4,629	4,670	4,588	4,549	4,595	4,590	-2.5%
137	Havdrup	4,000	3,973	3,975	3,972	4,085	4,188	4,236	4,302	4,370	4,398	4,365	4,392	+9.8%
138	Hjallerup	3,758	3,768	3,765	3,812	3,829	3,823	3,969	4,099	4,184	4,192	4,235	4,385	+16.7%
139	Gråsten	4,194	4,201	4,234	4,215	4,190	4,220	4,264	4,311	4,302	4,228	4,274	4,365	+4.1%
140	Høng	4,295	4,272	4,263	4,311	4,328	4,257	4,194	4,294	4,269	4,305	4,355	4,359	+1.5%
141	Kirke Hvalsø	3,992	3,988	4,018	4,035	4,119	4,086	4,096	4,197	4,218	4,222	4,294	4,340	+8.7%
142	Padborg	4,476	4,459	4,455	4,406	4,393	4,389	4,335	4,361	4,337	4,311	4,311	4,325	-3.4%
143	Jyderup	4,081	4,123	4,120	4,163	4,231	4,323	4,281	4,307	4,338	4,303	4,325	4,315	+5.7%
144	Svogerslev	4,273	4,289	4,320	4,320	4,317	4,379	4,363	4,326	4,274	4,261	4,267	4,313	+0.9%
145	Sunds	4,048	4,079	4,069	4,040	4,092	4,106	4,111	4,101	4,190	4,235	4,239	4,299	+6.2%
146	Langeskov	3,972	4,002	4,007	3,997	4,028	4,057	4,073	4,078	4,090	4,152	4,222	4,293	+8.1%
147	Videbæk	4,336	4,300	4,273	4,206	4,223	4,241	4,236	4,273	4,309	4,231	4,242	4,256	-1.8%
148	Årslev	3,665	3,690	3,700	3,733	3,722	3,823	3,863	3,998	4,015	4,113	4,193	4,250	+16.0%
149	Faxe	3,821	3,828	3,845	3,887	3,950	4,017	4,017	4,158	4,165	4,184	4,246	4,189	+9.6%
150	Lynge-Uggeløse	4,054	4,061	4,051	4,075	4,053	4,036	4,166	4,107	4,086	4,172	4,163	4,162	+2.7%
151	Tarm	4,136	4,055	4,084	4,075	4,058	3,980	4,044	4,040	3,991	4,016	4,010	4,104	-0.8%
152	Jægerspris	4,060	4,087	4,107	4,080	4,099	4,226	4,195	4,245	4,057	4,043	4,020	4,083	+0.6%
153	Bogense	3,702	3,750	3,721	3,710	3,751	3,815	3,891	3,949	3,990	3,976	4,059	4,074	+10.0%
154	Dianalund	3,979	3,965	3,971	4,003	4,038	4,017	4,013	4,058	4,063	4,127	4,127	4,057	+2.0%
155	Vildbjerg	3,915	4,016	3,970	4,045	4,065	4,050	4,045	4,051	4,020	4,017	4,029	4,033	+3.0%
156	Juelsminde	3,888	3,875	3,907	3,950	3,940	3,985	3,992	4,023	3,990	4,020	4,053	4,023	+3.5%
157	Brædstrup	3,488	3,513	3,516	3,534	3,629	3,635	3,653	3,634	3,637	3,736	3,992	4,005	+14.8%
158	Harlev	3,648	3,688	3,691	3,718	3,707	3,759	3,755	3,785	3,884	3,983	3,990	3,990	+9.4%
159	Løgstør	4,300	4,271	4,284	4,220	4,114	4,104	4,112	4,164	4,015	4,014	3,967	3,972	-7.6%
160	Frederiksberg	3,421	3,435	3,443	3,461	3,463	3,473	3,569	3,589	3,761	3,804	3,877	3,928	+14.8%
161	Tølløse	3,754	3,743	3,731	3,728	3,699	3,759	3,764	3,798	3,795	3,763	3,759	3,903	+4.0%
162	Præstø	3,853	3,806	3,808	3,821	3,835	3,864	3,891	3,876	3,814	3,834	3,857	3,893	+1.0%
163	Assentoft	3,311	3,360	3,383	3,387	3,427	3,457	3,505	3,541	3,658	3,791	3,811	3,822	+15.4%
164	Ølgod	3,926	3,920	3,831	3,853	3,857	3,892	3,923	3,860	3,827	3,779	3,705	3,777	-3.8%
165	Jelling	3,292	3,362	3,370	3,383	3,431	3,443	3,521	3,479	3,522	3,607	3,658	3,769	+14.5%
166	Stege	3,835	3,826	3,830	3,841	3,844	3,813	3,842	3,818	3,786	3,802	3,792	3,765	-1.8%
167	Virklund	3,316	3,331	3,338	3,368	3,394	3,429	3,442	3,445	3,475	3,507	3,609	3,683	+11.1%
168	Nexø	3,700	3,660	3,686	3,642	3,647	3,654	3,644	3,615	3,607	3,686	3,668	3,674	-0.7%
169	Store Heddinge	3,327	3,288	3,287	3,362	3,406	3,420	3,398	3,419	3,430	3,513	3,668	3,649	+9.7%
170	Gistrup	3,478	3,501	3,509	3,544	3,582	3,579	3,574	3,562	3,543	3,518	3,664	3,630	+4.4%
171	Hjortshøj	2,982	3,047	3,298	3,463	3,561	3,562	3,634	3,669	3,714	3,654	3,590	3,619	+21.4%
172	Græsted	3,514	3,547	3,576	3,573	3,621	3,627	3,680	3,669	3,674	3,621	3,561	3,581	+1.9%
173	Dronninglund	3,226	3,321	3,328	3,348	3,394	3,427	3,436	3,427	3,439	3,435	3,487	3,546	+9.9%
174	Taulov	3,357	3,367	3,350	3,354	3,398	3,371	3,350	3,355	3,347	3,354	3,402	3,513	+4.6%
175	Storvorde	3,282	3,316	3,306	3,303	3,305	3,331	3,336	3,338	3,376	3,386	3,425	3,431	+4.5%
176	Løgumkloster	3,665	3,629	3,584	3,547	3,600	3,598	3,594	3,608	3,556	3,550	3,480	3,419	-6.7%
177	Farsø	3,271	3,345	3,299	3,352	3,409	3,410	3,375	3,376	3,366	3,369	3,349	3,407	+4.2%
178	Glamsbjerg	3,216	3,205	3,205	3,214	3,217	3,239	3,302	3,247	3,275	3,293	3,344	3,350	+4.2%
179	Thurø By	3,328	3,302	3,270	3,244	3,223	3,232	3,245	3,238	3,230	3,266	3,280	3,348	+0.6%
180	Fjerritslev	3,402	3,379	3,341	3,353	3,310	3,398	3,458	3,401	3,376	3,332	3,326	3,335	-2.0%
181	Sabro	2,640	2,741	2,807	2,825	2,928	2,964	2,978	3,225	3,300	3,309	3,330	3,308	+25.3%
182	Vissenbjerg	3,140	3,142	3,118	3,114	3,204	3,193	3,229	3,214	3,233	3,214	3,232	3,297	+5.0%
183	Rønde	2,566	2,802	2,818	2,829	2,893	2,925	2,942	2,962	3,030	3,138	3,191	3,295	+28.4%
184	Søndersø	3,091	3,067	3,059	3,091	3,112	3,189	3,232	3,284	3,273	3,319	3,319	3,291	+6.5%
185	Broager	3,423	3,367	3,339	3,313	3,300	3,320	3,276	3,274	3,234	3,220	3,238	3,277	-4.3%
186	Toftlund	3,328	3,311	3,297	3,232	3,281	3,283	3,292	3,258	3,242	3,247	3,240	3,276	-1.6%
187	Aulum	3,153	3,169	3,128	3,139	3,178	3,228	3,244	3,268	3,296	3,273	3,249	3,247	+3.0%
188	Trige	2,748	2,799	2,847	2,864	2,869	2,878	2,858	2,810	3,096	3,193	3,191	3,224	+17.3%
189	Nørre Aaby	2,923	2,944	2,949	2,932	2,926	2,954	2,933	2,964	3,007	2,979	3,133	3,224	+10.3%
190	Skærbæk	3,098	3,126	3,062	3,074	3,028	3,121	3,134	3,131	3,151	3,153	3,135	3,211	+3.6%
191	Aarup	3,019	3,115	3,120	3,118	3,146	3,157	3,166	3,185	3,223	3,233	3,259	3,209	+6.3%
192	Lund	1,829	1,959	1,947	2,012	2,147	2,243	2,297	2,338	2,423	2,757	2,901	3,184	+74.1%
193	Sundby	2,842	2,817	2,847	2,797	2,820	2,843	2,921	2,953	3,038	3,040	3,065	3,178	+11.8%
194	Frejlev	2,608	2,632	2,625	2,648	2,690	2,779	2,823	2,871	2,940	2,970	3,056	3,169	+21.5%
195	Augustenborg	3,233	3,331	3,284	3,270	3,288	3,245	3,238	3,256	3,222	3,202	3,171	3,160	-2.3%
196	Auning	2,810	2,937	2,984	3,004	3,016	3,008	3,015	3,009	2,967	2,941	3,061	3,134	+11.5%
197	Bjæverskov	2,856	2,904	2,910	2,917	2,980	2,995	3,042	2,994	3,017	3,014	2,988	3,126	+9.5%
198	Søften	2,677	2,697	2,722	2,757	2,746	2,757	2,815	2,867	2,886	2,952	3,072	3,112	+16.2%
199	Asnæs	2,870	2,892	2,902	2,901	2,931	2,934	2,942	3,058	3,018	3,028	3,100	3,109	+8.3%
200	Lejre	2,387	2,402	2,379	2,415	2,382	2,411	2,405	2,442	2,587	2,834	3,127	3,097	+29.7%
201	Skibby	3,166	3,139	3,146	3,127	3,129	3,191	3,193	3,190	3,126	3,148	3,120	3,092	-2.3%
202	Ejby	2,831	2,861	2,995	3,118	3,154	3,142	3,181	3,129	3,158	3,131	3,098	3,088	+9.1%
203	Vindinge	2,111	2,124	2,189	2,285	2,341	2,450	2,464	2,482	2,572	2,896	3,059	3,087	+46.2%
204	Sindal	3,090	3,079	3,066	3,058	3,055	3,069	3,007	2,990	3,057	3,110	3,095	3,085	-0.2%
205	Brejning	2,809	2,899	2,873	2,855	2,952	3,016	3,051	3,036	3,089	3,067	3,060	3,084	+9.8%
206	Sankt Klemens	2,526	2,623	2,772	2,861	2,905	2,959	3,004	3,185	3,194	3,214	3,164	3,072	+21.6%
207	Vinderup	3,122	3,121	3,115	3,112	3,171	3,164	3,151	3,174	3,127	3,095	3,077	3,068	-1.7%
208	Holsted	3,147	3,118	3,109	3,120	3,137	3,111	3,136	3,122	3,123	3,095	3,046	3,066	-2.6%
209	Skørping	2,875	2,872	2,872	2,862	2,932	2,958	2,982	2,980	2,955	2,957	2,971	3,043	+5.8%
210	Egebjerg	2,119	2,138	2,292	2,302	2,310	2,409	2,544	2,660	2,960	3,067	2,969	3,020	+42.5%
211	Blovstrød	2,211	2,195	2,169	2,148	2,202	2,211	2,264	2,743	2,913	2,938	2,968	3,007	+36.0%
212	Christiansfeld	2,863	2,898	2,855	2,880	2,934	2,935	2,956	2,996	3,016	3,008	2,977	2,985	+4.3%
213	Lunderskov	3,010	3,016	3,017	3,033	3,071	3,074	3,096	3,069	3,105	3,060	3,016	2,976	-1.1%
214	Tørring	2,462	2,511	2,565	2,596	2,672	2,750	2,764	2,765	2,770	2,890	2,945	2,964	+20.4%
215	Pandrup	2,815	2,871	2,880	2,879	2,954	2,929	2,940	2,934	2,925	2,898	2,862	2,909	+3.3%
216	Tjæreborg	2,568	2,586	2,669	2,690	2,693	2,711	2,734	2,749	2,804	2,907	2,904	2,897	+12.8%
217	Hårlev	2,516	2,569	2,577	2,572	2,598	2,588	2,633	2,677	2,753	2,780	2,865	2,894	+15.0%
218	Ganløse	2,916	2,920	2,888	2,875	2,882	2,895	2,865	2,895	2,884	2,899	2,892	2,890	-0.9%
219	Vestbjerg	2,675	2,700	2,704	2,695	2,735	2,810	2,893	2,896	2,866	2,873	2,888	2,888	+8.0%
220	Langå	2,864	2,870	2,869	2,867	2,869	2,877	2,875	2,787	2,805	2,823	2,811	2,879	+0.5%
221	Skævinge	2,551	2,555	2,583	2,559	2,577	2,631	2,638	2,653	2,642	2,617	2,613	2,859	+12.1%
222	Højslev Stationsby	2,746	2,764	2,811	2,814	2,812	2,820	2,812	2,867	2,852	2,845	2,833	2,854	+3.9%
223	Oksbøl	2,907	2,877	2,885	2,852	2,825	2,858	2,853	2,867	2,837	2,818	2,815	2,844	-2.2%
224	Hvide Sande	3,059	3,077	3,046	3,015	3,059	3,045	3,016	2,968	2,932	2,876	2,874	2,843	-7.1%
225	Svinninge	2,759	2,764	2,770	2,790	2,795	2,873	2,780	2,772	2,802	2,808	2,862	2,818	+2.1%
226	Aalestrup	2,720	2,739	2,729	2,742	2,761	2,775	2,788	2,824	2,743	2,740	2,780	2,794	+2.7%
227	Rødding	2,652	2,667	2,666	2,648	2,719	2,735	2,716	2,693	2,678	2,720	2,712	2,784	+5.0%
228	Rønnede	2,453	2,462	2,430	2,402	2,398	2,456	2,462	2,457	2,473	2,540	2,746	2,784	+13.5%
229	Nordby	2,638	2,649	2,659	2,658	2,692	2,707	2,725	2,724	2,795	2,754	2,736	2,738	+3.8%
230	Tinglev	2,784	2,771	2,729	2,749	2,761	2,803	2,790	2,789	2,746	2,721	2,731	2,738	-1.7%
231	Gundsømagle	2,340	2,359	2,371	2,395	2,488	2,584	2,633	2,649	2,734	2,743	2,770	2,733	+16.8%
232	Hurup	2,789	2,772	2,765	2,757	2,773	2,745	2,754	2,717	2,731	2,690	2,705	2,707	-2.9%
233	Høruphav	2,672	2,662	2,620	2,629	2,611	2,625	2,660	2,675	2,671	2,641	2,701	2,706	+1.3%
234	Ryomgård	2,376	2,417	2,452	2,455	2,460	2,432	2,428	2,460	2,456	2,459	2,498	2,671	+12.4%
235	Brovst	2,804	2,776	2,755	2,763	2,770	2,733	2,781	2,767	2,729	2,696	2,624	2,664	-5.0%
236	Kibæk	2,664	2,653	2,646	2,629	2,648	2,624	2,644	2,707	2,710	2,699	2,667	2,638	-1.0%
237	Skibet	2,163	2,125	2,094	2,103	2,091	2,085	2,165	2,217	2,285	2,460	2,427	2,630	+21.6%
238	Ullerslev	2,743	2,771	2,732	2,704	2,770	2,788	2,758	2,749	2,706	2,685	2,640	2,622	-4.4%
239	Vrå	2,522	2,451	2,434	2,459	2,478	2,484	2,461	2,454	2,474	2,445	2,509	2,615	+3.7%
240	Østbirk	2,062	2,084	2,105	2,124	2,133	2,179	2,227	2,225	2,223	2,294	2,413	2,606	+26.4%
241	Mariager	2,589	2,558	2,558	2,527	2,510	2,490	2,496	2,523	2,537	2,539	2,506	2,605	+0.6%
242	Forlev	2,510	2,496	2,465	2,475	2,498	2,528	2,511	2,485	2,525	2,542	2,571	2,580	+2.8%
243	Stoholm	2,543	2,533	2,530	2,500	2,539	2,531	2,561	2,556	2,522	2,514	2,533	2,566	+0.9%
244	Vester Hassing	2,534	2,557	2,525	2,543	2,572	2,554	2,547	2,527	2,525	2,552	2,589	2,560	+1.0%
245	Vadum	2,292	2,291	2,307	2,328	2,320	2,336	2,313	2,307	2,355	2,417	2,532	2,559	+11.6%
246	Arden	2,444	2,444	2,474	2,506	2,542	2,510	2,504	2,500	2,514	2,542	2,505	2,523	+3.2%
247	Stevnstrup	1,867	1,900	1,898	1,944	2,059	2,185	2,267	2,327	2,368	2,390	2,545	2,522	+35.1%
248	Haarby	2,473	2,492	2,460	2,449	2,462	2,462	2,481	2,493	2,480	2,477	2,464	2,521	+1.9%
249	Hals	2,487	2,495	2,518	2,483	2,483	2,459	2,532	2,452	2,454	2,498	2,521	2,497	+0.4%
250	Liseleje	2,588	2,603	2,556	2,587	2,550	2,556	2,578	2,558	2,499	2,496	2,507	2,493	-3.7%
251	Starup	2,468	2,506	2,487	2,467	2,486	2,517	2,508	2,488	2,468	2,466	2,488	2,492	+1.0%
252	Nyråd	2,479	2,442	2,439	2,455	2,507	2,514	2,517	2,508	2,469	2,472	2,488	2,491	+0.5%
253	Faxe Ladeplads	2,867	2,874	2,872	2,863	2,843	2,867	2,889	2,901	2,883	2,874	2,884	2,487	-13.3%
254	Gram	2,419	2,440	2,451	2,460	2,526	2,562	2,582	2,571	2,549	2,506	2,521	2,486	+2.8%
255	Guderup	2,581	2,558	2,567	2,578	2,548	2,531	2,490	2,475	2,408	2,394	2,372	2,416	-6.4%
256	Hørve	2,379	2,377	2,431	2,430	2,493	2,514	2,504	2,470	2,456	2,422	2,412	2,416	+1.6%
257	Kås	2,638	2,618	2,575	2,574	2,601	2,558	2,514	2,522	2,490	2,405	2,355	2,326	-11.8%

== See also ==
- List of urban areas in Sweden by population
- List of towns and cities in Norway
- List of urban areas in the Nordic countries
- World's largest cities
- List of municipalities of Denmark
