= Sønderborg Municipality =

Sønderborg Municipality Sønderborg Kommune (Danish) Kommune Sonderburg (German)
- Municipality
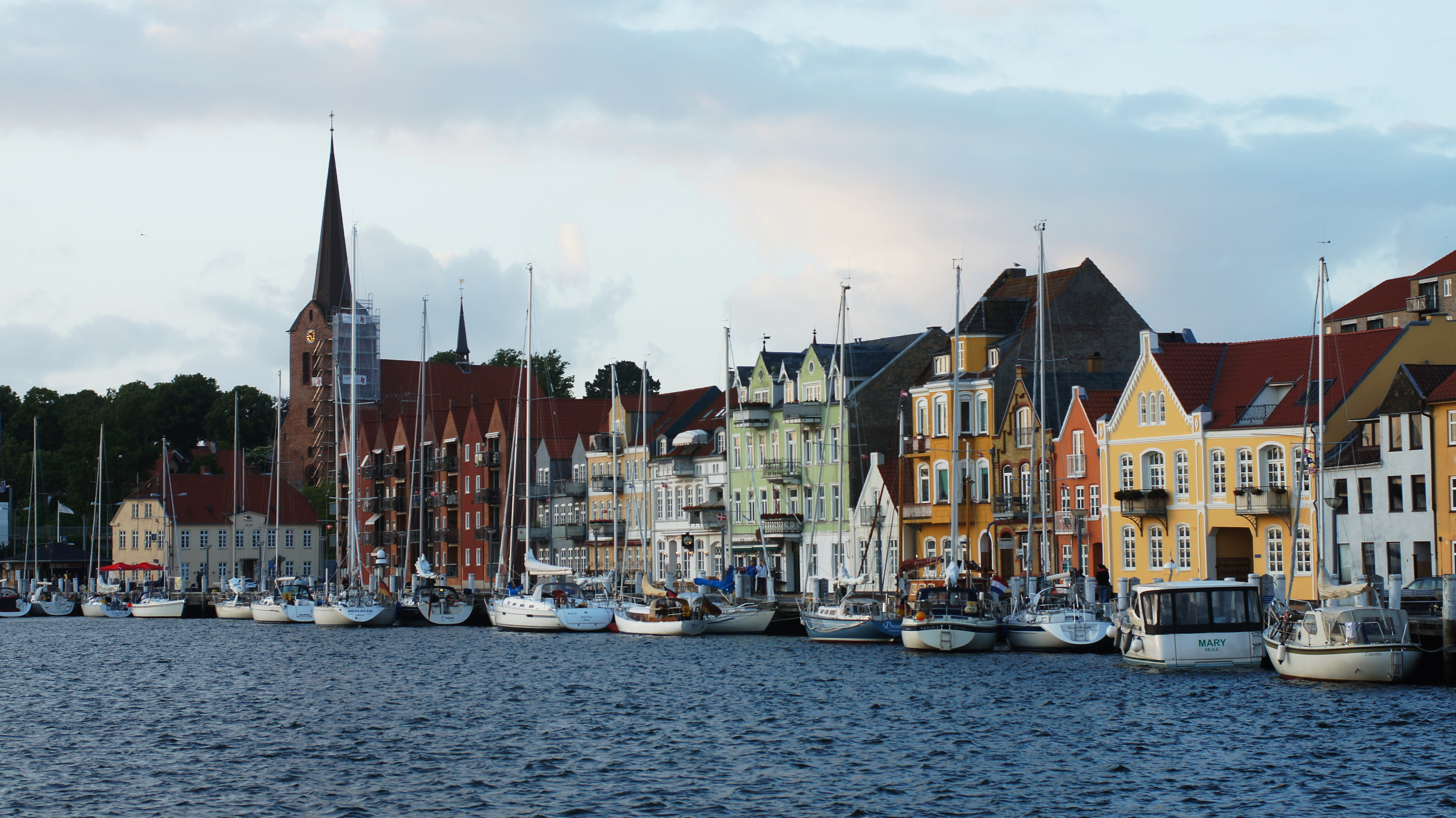

- Coat of arms

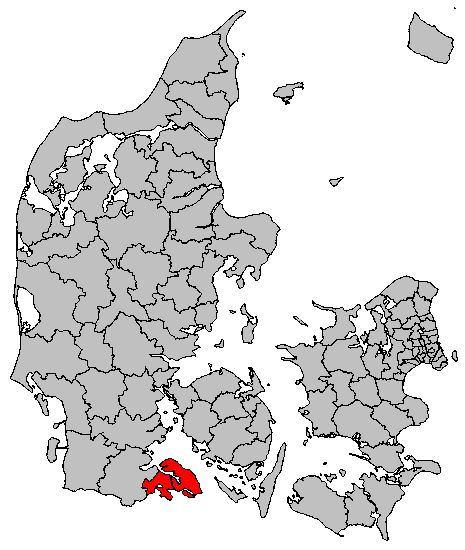
- Sønderborg Municipality in Denmark
- Coordinates: 54°55′0″N 9°47′0″E
- Country: Denmark
- Region: Southern Denmark
- Established: January 2007

Government
  - Mayor: Erik Lauritzen

Area
  - Total: 496 km^{2} (192 sq mi)

Population (1 January 2026)
  - Total: 74,123
  - Density: 149/km^{2} (387/sq mi)
- Time zone: UTC+1 (CET)
  - Summer (DST): UTC+2 (CEST)
- Postal codes: 6400
- Website: sonderborgkommune.dk

Sønderborg Municipality (Danish: Sønderborg Kommune, German: Kommune Sonderburg) is a kommune in the Region of Southern Denmark partially on the Jutland peninsula and partially on the island of Als in south Denmark, at the border with Germany. The municipality covers an area of 495.86 km^{2} (191.45 sq mi), and has a population of 74,123 (as of 2026). Its mayor as of 1 January 2014 is Erik Lauritzen, a member of the Social Democratic party.

== Geography ==
The municipality is split into two sections separated by Alssund, the waterway which separates the island of Als from the Jutland mainland.

=== Locations ===
Sønderborg	28,300
Nordborg	5,700
Gråsten	4,300
Broager	3,200
Augustenborg	3,200
Høruphav	2,700
Guderup	2,400
Dybbøl	2,400
Vester Sottrup	1,400
Egernsund	1,400
Rinkenæs	1,300
Nybøl	1,100
Fynshav	786
Tandslet	623
Svenstrup	597
Lysabild	510

==== The city of Sønderborg ====
The site of its municipal council is the town of Sønderborg.

== Politics ==
Sønderborg's municipal council consists of 31 members, elected every four years. The municipal council has 11 political committees.

=== Municipal council ===
Below are the municipal councils elected since the Municipal Reform of 2007.

Election	Party									Total seats	Turnout	Elected mayor
Election	A	C	D	F	L	O	S	V	Ø	Total seats	Turnout	Elected mayor
2005	15	1			6	1	1	7		31	76.2%	Jan Prokopek Jensen (A)
2009	12	1		2	8	2	1	5		31	69.3%	Aase Nyegaard (L)
2013	12	1			2	3	3	9	1	31	74.1%	Erik Lauritzen (A)
2017	15				1	3	5	7		31	74.5%	Erik Lauritzen (A)
2021	14		1			1	3	11	1	31	69.0%	Erik Lauritzen (A)
Data from Kmdvalg.dk 2005, 2009, 2013, 2017 and 2021

=== 2007 administrative reform ===
On 1 January 2007, as part of Kommunalreformen ("The Municipal Reform" of 2007), the former Sønderborg municipality, located on Als and the mainland, was combined with Augustenborg (on Als), Broager, Gråsten, Nordborg (on Als), Sydals (on Als), and Sundeved municipalities to form a new Sønderborg municipality. The municipality shares the number one position with Lolland Municipality of being formed through the merger of most former municipalities in the reform of 2007:seven (7). The former Sønderborg municipality covered an area of 54 km^{2} (21 sq mi), and had a population of 30,555 (2005). Its last mayor was Arne Peder Hansen, a member of the Venstre (Liberal Party) political party.

== Economy ==
The municipality is home to two of the major industrial companies in Denmark: Danfoss and Linak.

== North Schleswig Germans ==
Sønderborg Municipality is home to the only officially recognised ethno-linguistic minority of Denmark proper, the North Schleswig Germans. This minority makes up about 6% of the total population of the municipalities of Aabenraa/Apenrade, Haderslev/Hadersleben, Sønderborg/Sonderburg and Tønder/Tondern. In these four municipalities, the German minority enjoys certain linguistic rights in accordance with the European Charter for Regional or Minority Languages.

== International relations ==
=== Twin towns — Sister cities ===
Sønderborg is twinned with:

- Zabrze,Poland
- Baoding,China
