= Sundeved =

Peninsula in Denmark

Coordinates: 54°57′N 9°41′E

- Peninsula
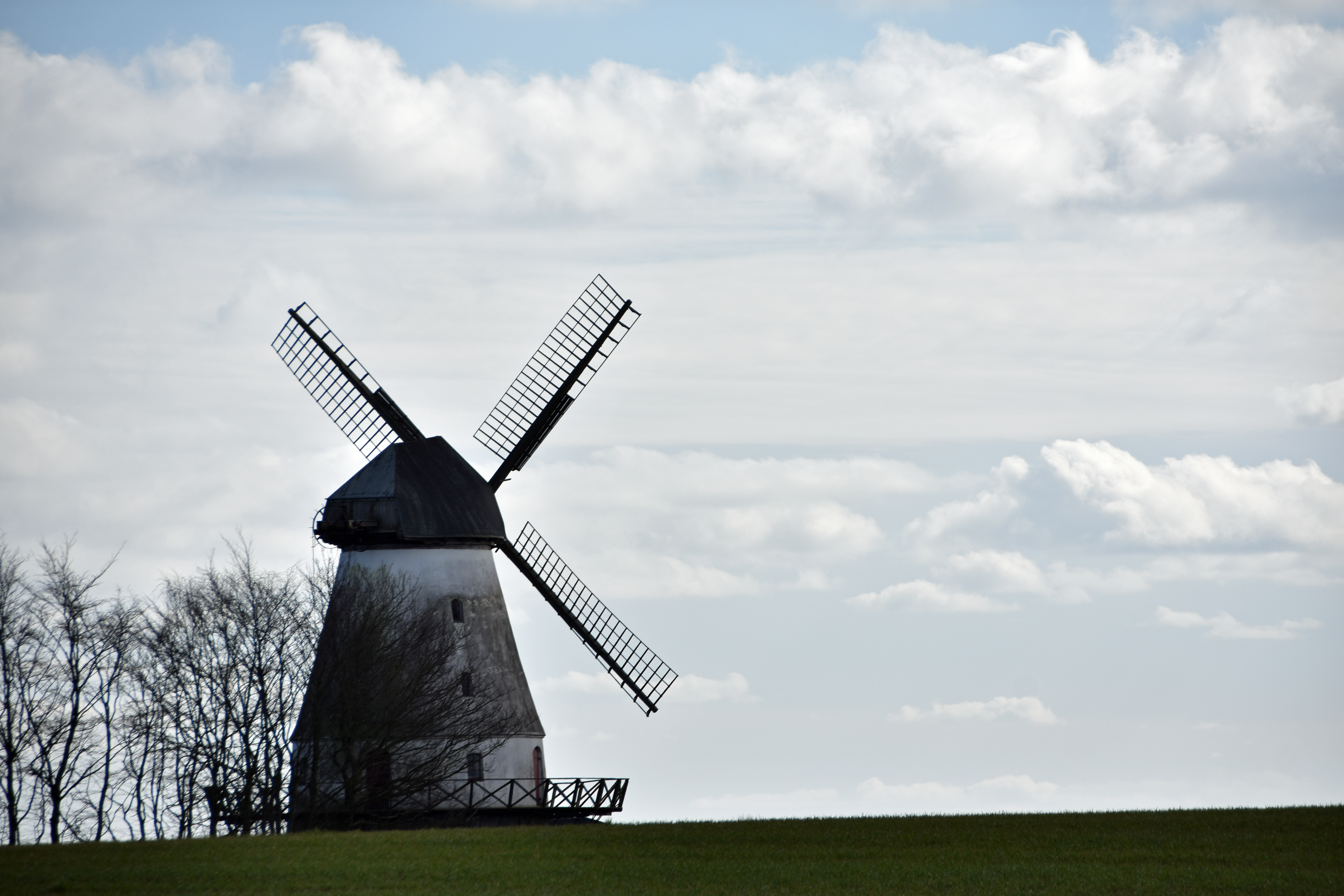
- Nybøl Mølle
- Interactive map of Sundeved
- Coordinates
- Location: Sønderborg Municipality, Denmark
- Part of: Jutland
- Water bodies: Alssund and Flensburg Firth

Sundeved (German: Sundewitt) is a peninsula on the east coast of the Jutland peninsula in south Denmark. It lies between Åbenrå Fjord and Als Fjord to the north, Alssund to the east and Flensborg Fjord to the south. The westernmost part of the city of Sønderborg is located on the peninsula, while most of the city lies on the neighboring island of Als.

== History ==
=== Sundeved Municipality ===
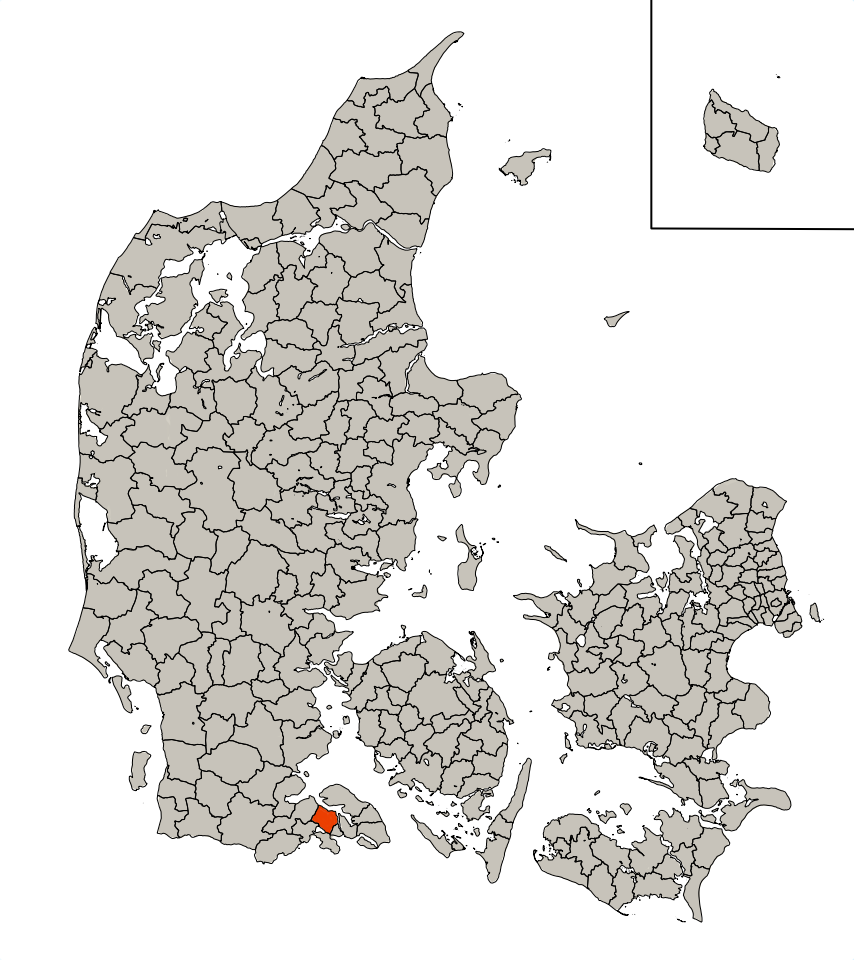
Location of Sundeved Municipality in Denmark until 2007.

Until 2007, Sundeved (German: Sundewitt) was also the name of a municipality in the former South Jutland County. The municipality covered an area of 69 km^{2}, and had a total population of 5,298 (2005). Its last mayor was John Solkær Pedersen. Towns in the municipality included Avnbøl, Ballebro, Blans, Stenderup, Ullerup, Vester Sottrup, and Øster Sottrup.

The municipality was created in 1970 as the result a kommunalreform ("Municipality Reform") that merged a number of existing parishes: Nybøl Parish, Sottrup Parish, and Ullerup Parish. Sundeved municipality ceased to exist as the result of Kommunalreformen ("The Municipality Reform" of 2007). It was combined with existing Augustenborg, Broager, Gråsten, Nordborg, Sydals, and Sønderborg municipalities to form the new Sønderborg Municipality. This created a municipality with an area of 499 km^{2} and a total population of over 70,000 people (2005). The new municipality belongs to the new Region of Southern Denmark.

== Notable people ==
- Johannes Gelert (1852 in Nybøl – 1923) a Danish-born sculptor, who emigrated to the United States in 1887
- Otto Gelert (1862 in Nybøl on Sundeved peninsula – 1899) a Danish pharmacist and botanist, who specialized in plant floristics and systematics
