= Tandslet =

- Village
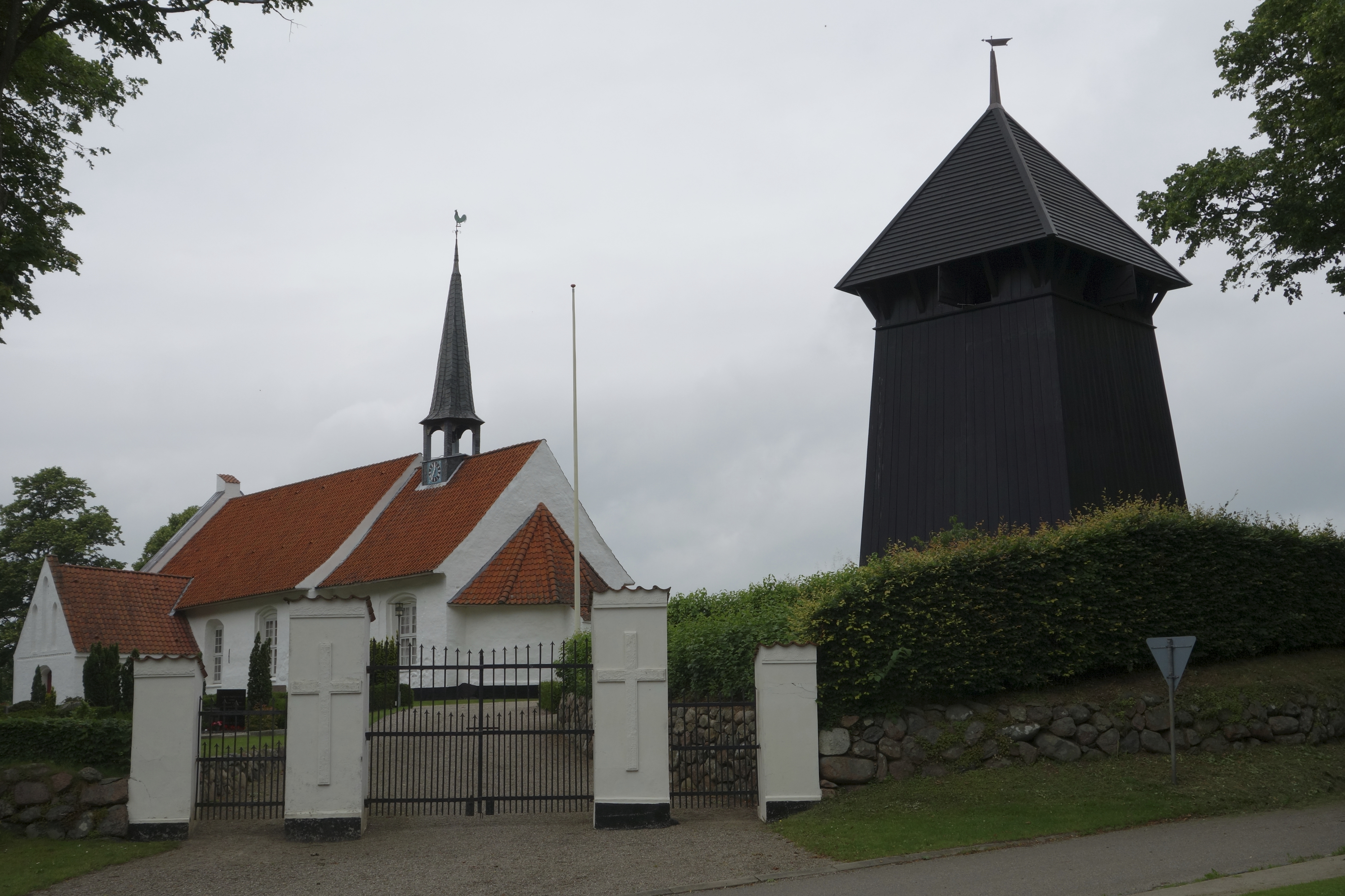
- Tandslet Church

- Location within Region of Southern Denmark Location within Denmark
- Coordinates: 54°55′29″N 9°58′35″E
- Country: Denmark
- Region: Southern Denmark
- Municipality: Sønderborg

Population (2026)
  - Total: 604

Tandslet is a village, with a population 604 (1 January 2026), in Sønderborg Municipality, Region of Southern Denmark in Denmark.

The village is situated on the island of Als 9 km southeast of Augustenborg, 9 km south of Fynshav, 7 km northeast of Høruphav and 16 km east of Sønderborg.

Tandslet consist of two parts, Over Tandslet on the western side and Neder Tandslet on the eastern side of the village, along a 2.3 km long mainstreet making Tandslet a very elongated village.

Tandslet Church is located in Over Tandslet.
