= Otto Gelert =

Danish pharmacist and botanist (1862–1899)

Otto Christian Leonor Gelert (9 November 1862 in Nybøl on Sundeved peninsula – 20 March 1899 in Copenhagen) was a Danish pharmacist and botanist, who specialized in plant floristics and systematics. He was a brother of sculptor Johannes Gelert.

In 1883 he received his degree in pharmacy and subsequently worked as a druggist in the communities of Ribe and Horsens. In 1885 he started to co-edit the exsiccata series Rubi exsiccati Daniae et Slesvigiae together with Peter Kristian Nicolaj Friderichsen. From 1894 he worked as chemist at a sugar refinery in Tangermünde, Germany. During the latter part of his career he worked at the botanical museum in Copenhagen. In 1897 he took a scientific excursion to the Canary Islands. In 1899 he died of tuberculosis in Copenhagen, aged 36.

Plants with the specific epithet of gelertii commemorate his name, and example being Taraxacum gelertii.

== Published works ==
- Danmarks og Slesvigs Rubi, (with Kristian Friderichsen), 1887 – Danish and Schleswig Rubus.
- Studier over Slægten Batrachium, 1896 – Studies of the genus Batrachium.
- "Notes on Arctic Plants", in: Botanisk Tidsskrift, vol. 21, 1898.
- "Flora arctica, containing descriptions of the flowering plants and ferns found in the Arctic regions, with their distribution in these countries", 1902 (edited by Carl Hansen Ostenfeld).
