= Svenstrup, Sønderborg Municipality =

Svenstrup
- Village
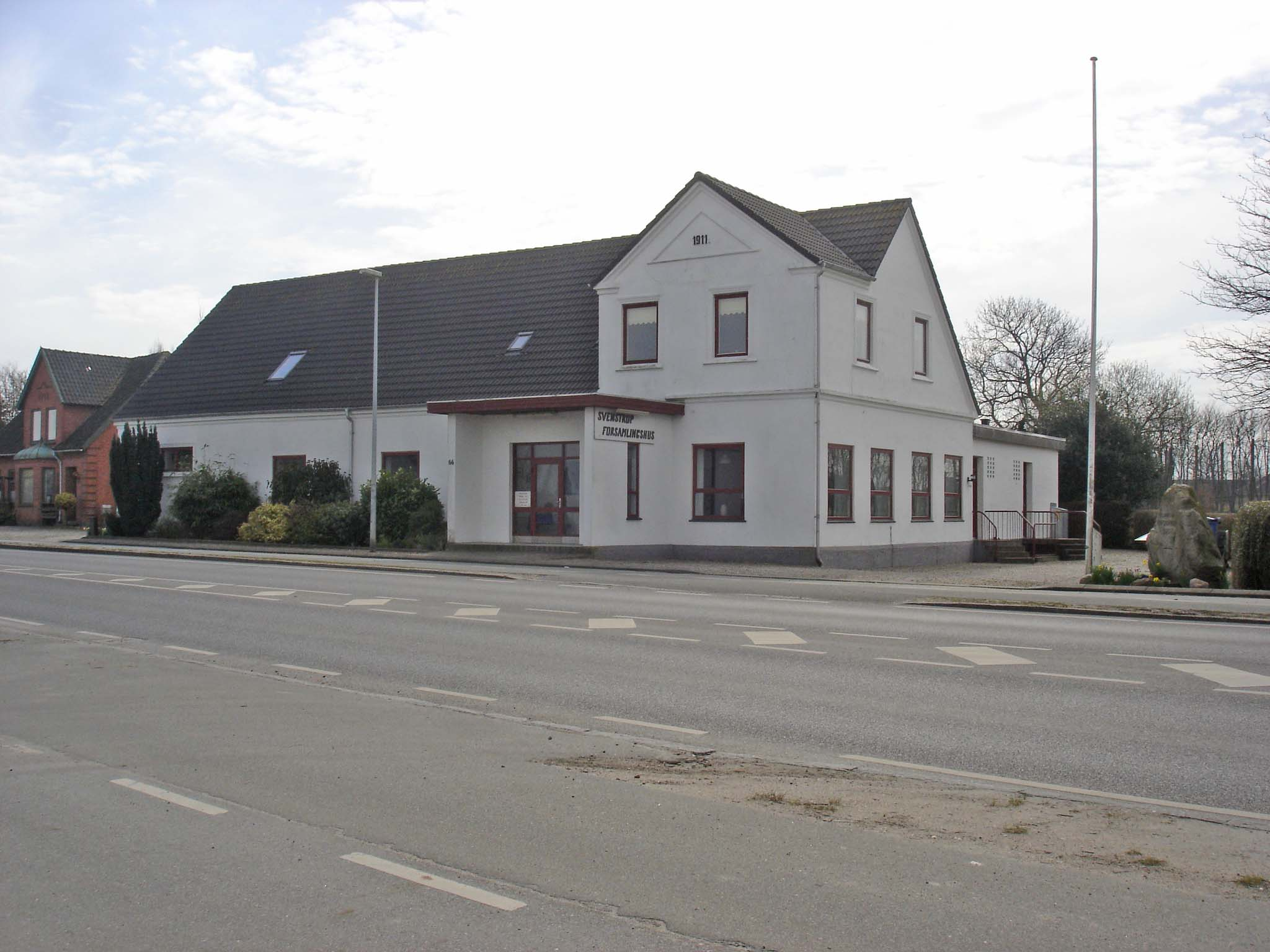
- The village hall in Svenstrup

- Location within Region of Southern Denmark Location within Denmark
- Coordinates: 55°1′36″N 9°49′30″E
- Country: Denmark
- Region: Southern Denmark
- Municipality: Sønderborg

Population (2026)
  - Total: 592

Svenstrup (German: Schwenstrup) is a village, with a population of 592 (1 January 2026), in Sønderborg Municipality, Region of Southern Denmark in Denmark.

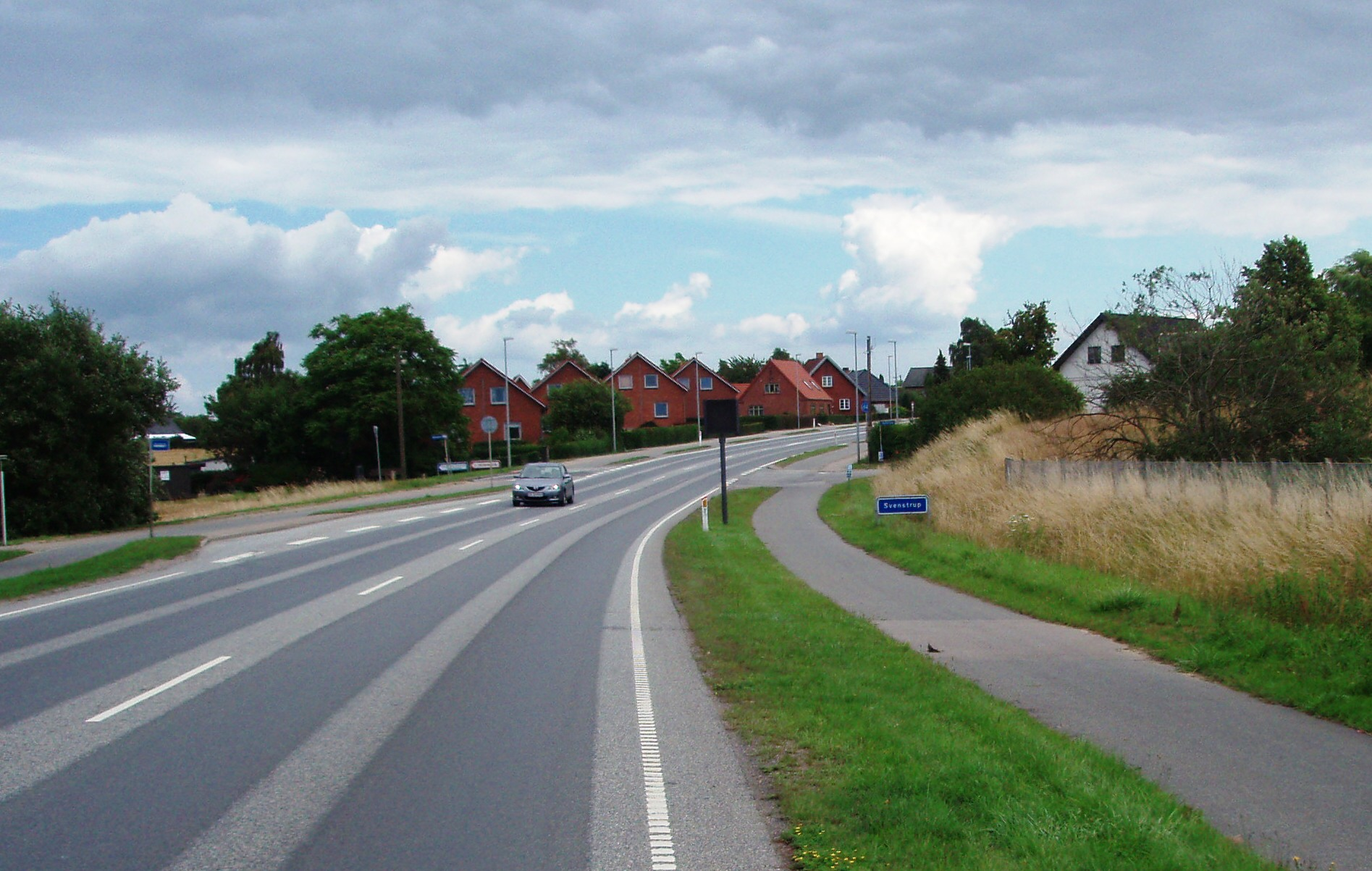
Approach to Svenstrup from Nordborg

Svenstrup is situated on the island of Als 5 km northwest of Guderup, 7 km southeast of Nordborg and 19 km north of Sønderborg.

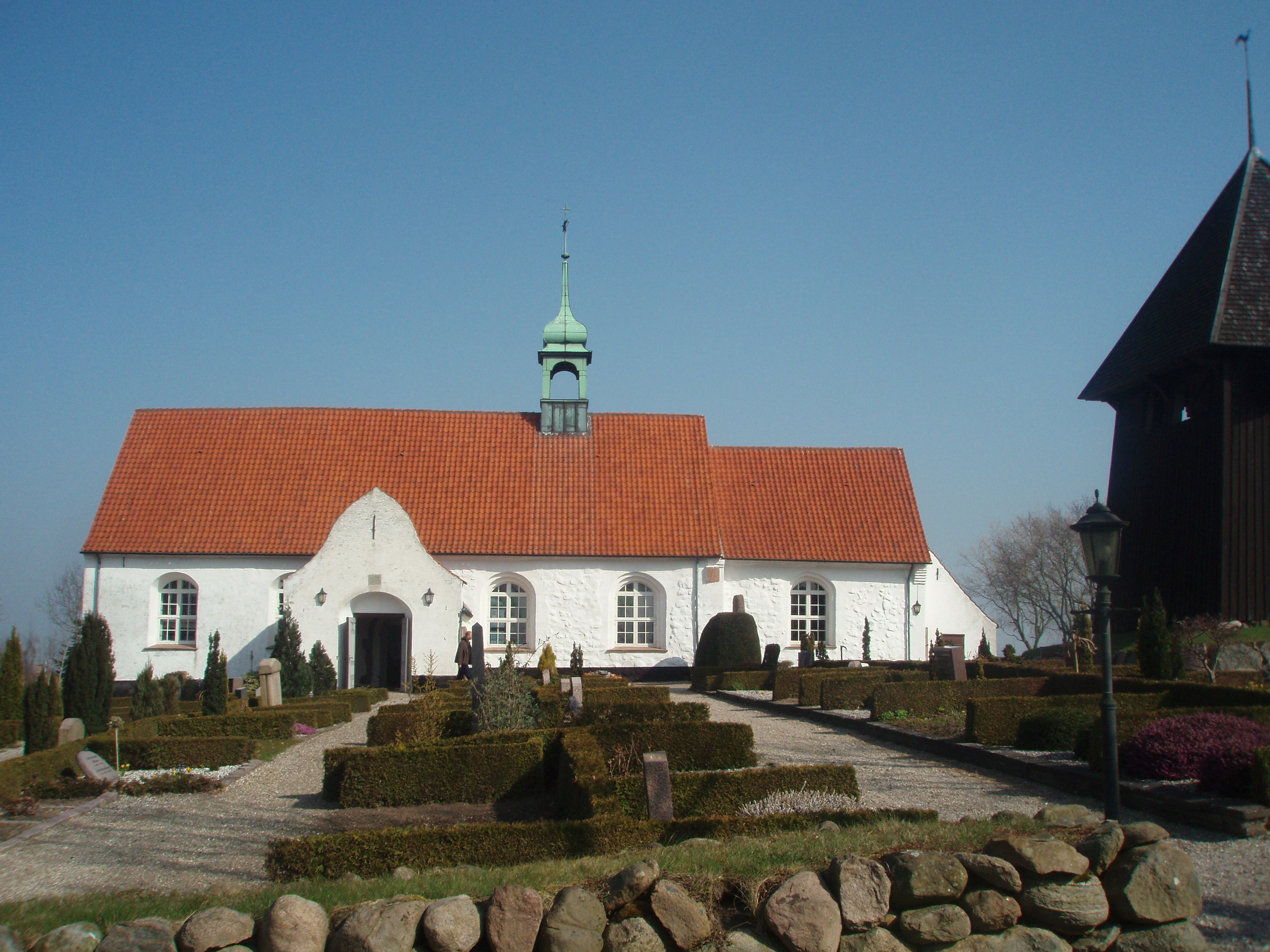
Svenstrup Church

Svenstrup Church is located in the western part of the village.
