= Svenstrup =

Svenstrup may refer to:

- Svenstrup, Aalborg Municipality, a town in Aalborg Municipality, Denmark
  - Svenstrup railway station, a railway station serving the town
- Svenstrup, Slagelse Municipality, a town in Slagelse Municipality, Denmark
- Svenstrup, Sønderborg Municipality, a village on the island of Als, Denmark
- Svenstrup (manor house), a manor house in Køge Municipality
- Svenstrup & Vendelboe, a Danish electro/dance/house producer team
