= Sydals Municipality =

Former municipality in Sønderjylland, Denmark

Coordinates: 54°53′57″N 9°58′00″E

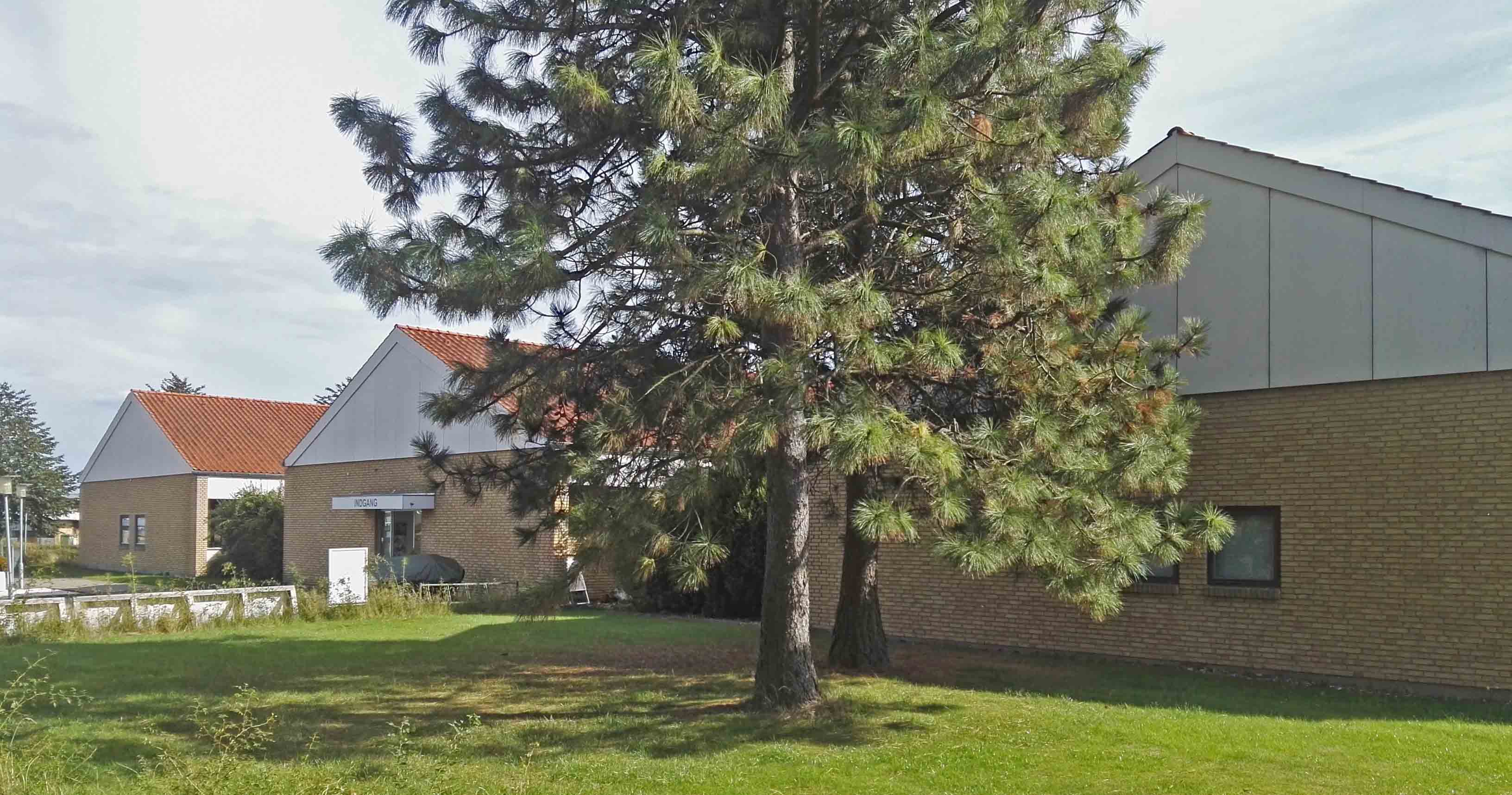

Until 1 January 2007 Sydals (German: Südalsen) was a municipality (Danish, kommune) in South Jutland County on the southern part of the island of Als off the east coast of the Jutland peninsula in south Denmark. The municipality covered an area of 95 km^{2}, and had a total population of 6,527 (2005). Its last mayor was Jens Peter Kock. The site of its municipal council was the town of Hørup. Other towns and villages in the municipality were Høruphav, Lysabild, Mommark, Skovby, Sønderby and Tandslet.

Ferry service connects the former municipality at the town of Mommark to the island of Ærø at the town of Søby.

The municipality was created in 1970 as the result of a kommunalreform ("Municipality Reform") that merged a number of existing parishes:

- Hørup Parish
- Kegnæs Parish
- Lysabild Parish
- Tandslet Parish

Sydals municipality ceased to exist due to Kommunalreformen ("The Municipality Reform" of 2007). It was combined with Augustenborg, Broager, Gråsten, Nordborg, Sundeved, and Sønderborg municipalities to form the new Sønderborg municipality. This created a municipality with an area of 499 km^{2} and a total population of 49,886 (2005). The new municipality belongs to Region of Southern Denmark.
