= Vester Sottrup =

- Town
- Location within Region of Southern Denmark Location within Denmark
- Coordinates: 54°56′56″N 9°41′56″E
- Country: Denmark
- Region: Southern Denmark
- Municipality: Sønderborg
- Parish: Sottrup Parish

Area
  - Urban: 1 km^{2} (0.39 sq mi)

Population (2026)
  - Urban: 1,455
  - Urban density: 1,500/km^{2} (3,800/sq mi)
- Time zone: UTC+1 (CET)
  - Summer (DST): UTC+2 (CEST)
- Postal code: DK-6400 Sønderborg

Vester Sottrup (German: Wester-Satrup) is a small town, with a population of 1,455 (1 January 2026), in Sønderborg Municipality, in the Region of Southern Denmark in Denmark.

Vester Sottrup is situated on the Sundeved peninsula, 13 km northeast of Gråsten, 8 km north of Broager and 9 km northwest of Sønderborg.

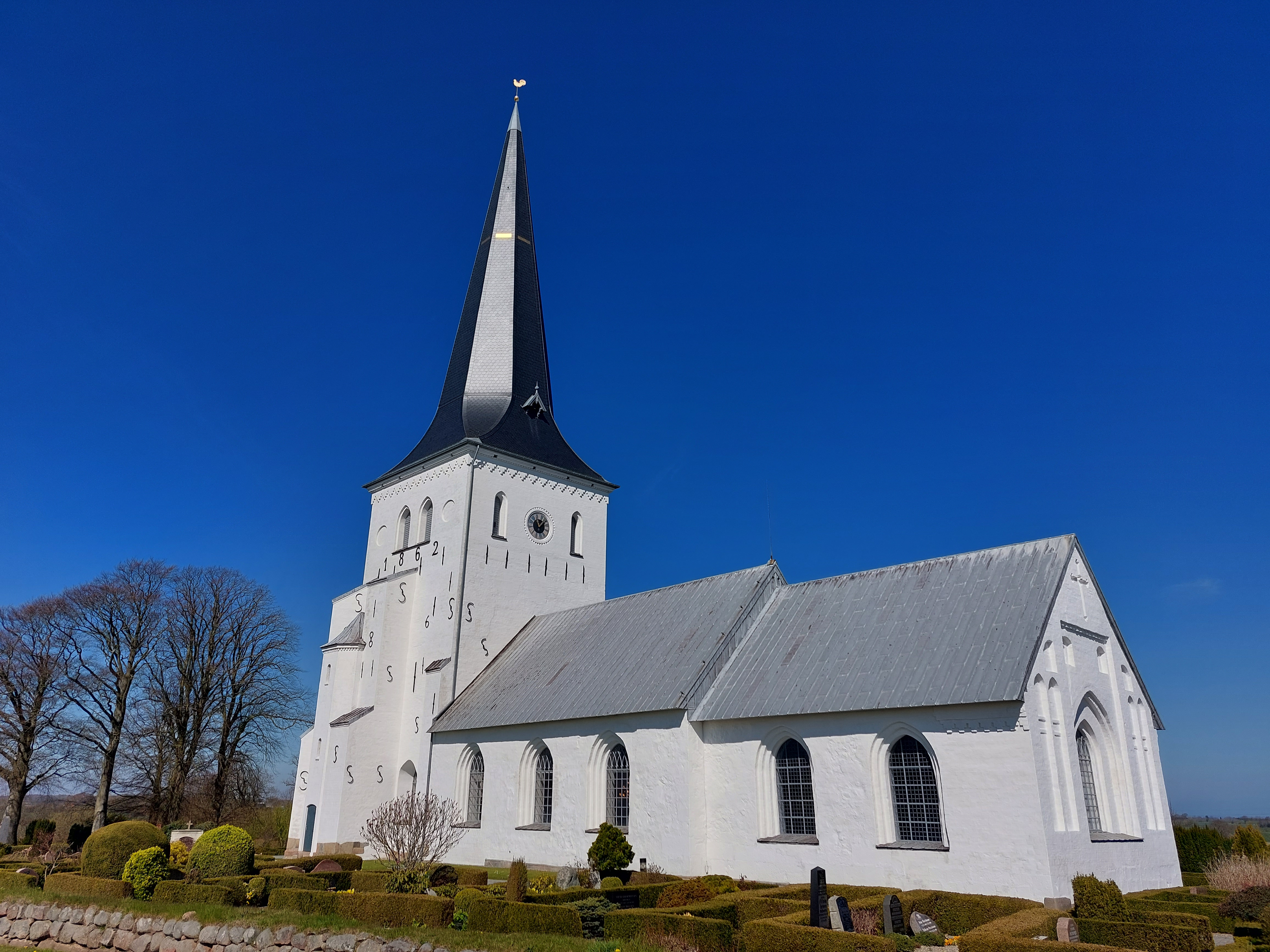
Sottrup Church in Vester Sottrup

Sottrup Church was built in the 13th century and is located in the western part of the town.
