= Rinkenæs =

Rinkenæs may refer to:

- Rinkenæs, Denmark (German: Rinkeness), a town in Denmark.
- SS Rinkenæs, a Danish cargo ship in service 1946–1947
