= Nybøl =

- Town
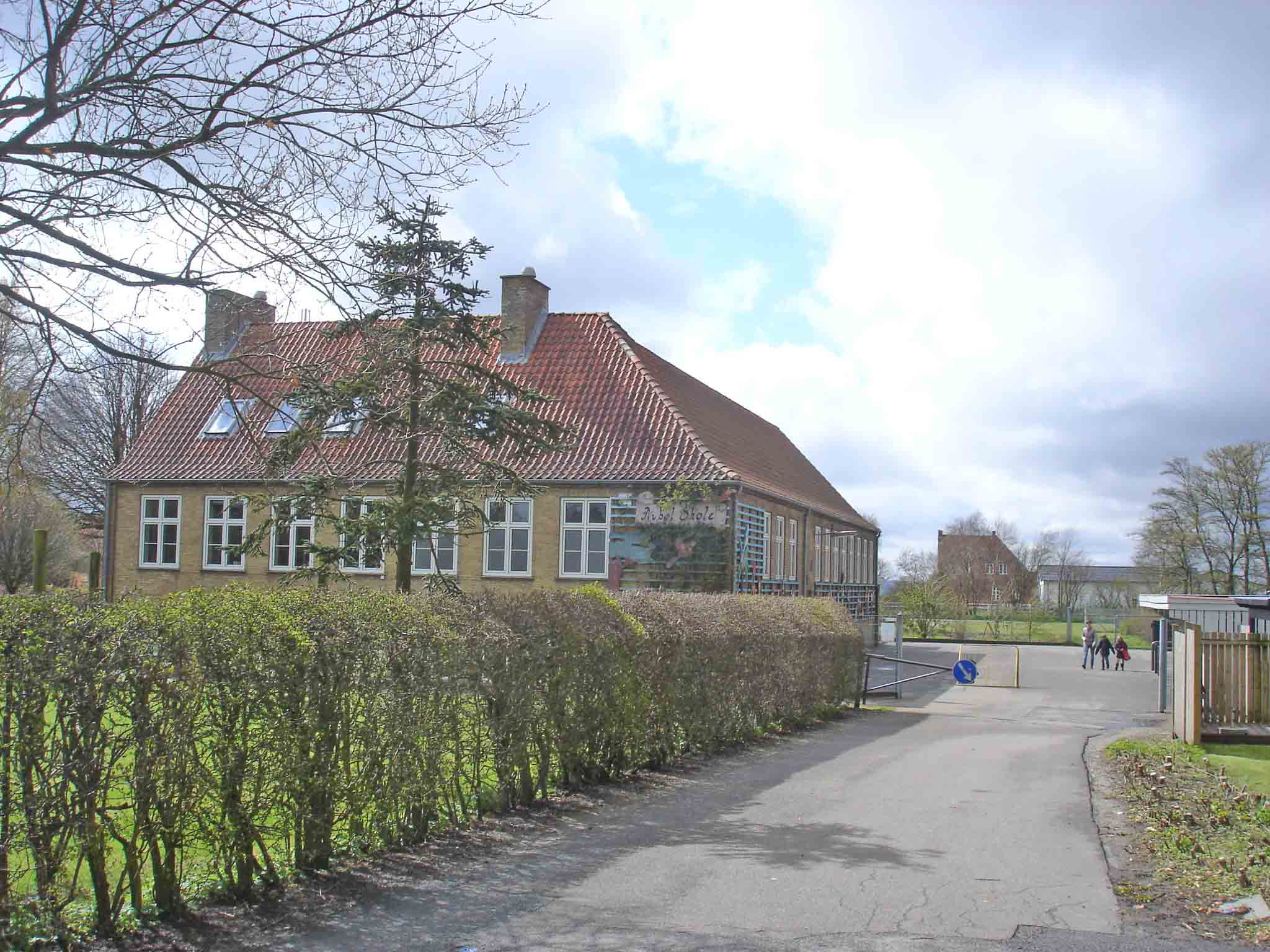
- Nybøl School

- Location within Region of Southern Denmark Location within Denmark
- Coordinates: 54°55′27″N 9°40′34″E
- Country: Denmark
- Region: Southern Denmark
- Municipality: Sønderborg

Area
  - Urban: 0.8 km^{2} (0.31 sq mi)

Population (2026)
  - Urban: 1,159
  - Urban density: 1,400/km^{2} (3,800/sq mi)
- Time zone: UTC+1 (CET)
  - Summer (DST): UTC+2 (CEST)
- Postal code: DK-6400 Sønderborg

Nybøl (German: Nübel, South Jutlandic: Nøffel) is a small town, with a population of 1,159 (1 January 2026), in Sønderborg Municipality, Region of Southern Denmark in Denmark.

Nybøl is situated on the Sundeved peninsula 4 km north of Broager, 9 km east of Gråsten and 9 km west of Sønderborg.

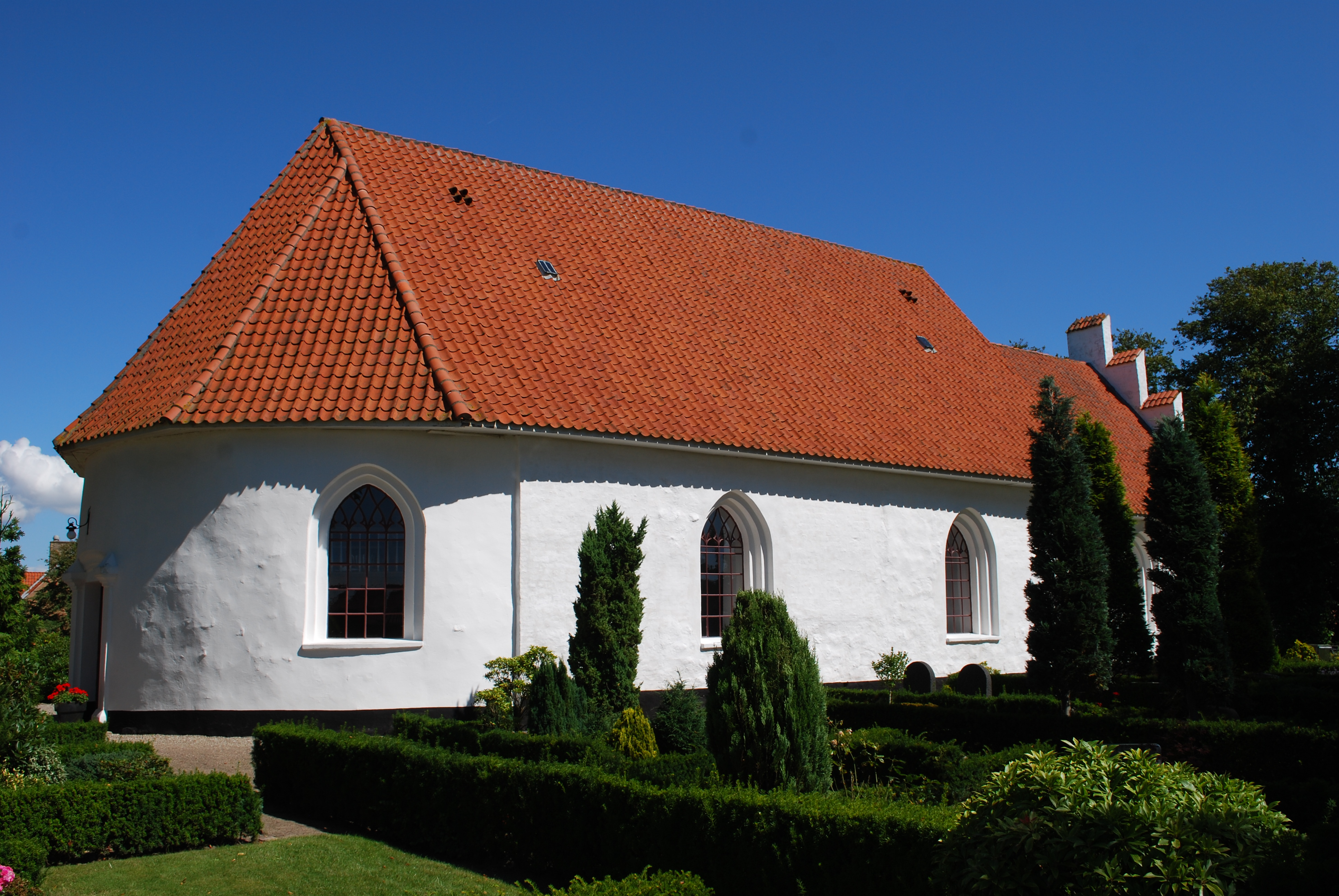
Nybøl Church

Nybøl Church built around 1150 is located in the town.

== Notable people ==
- The Danish-American sculptor Johannes Gelert (1852–1923) was born in Nybøl.
