= Andreas Hohwü =

Danish clockmaker

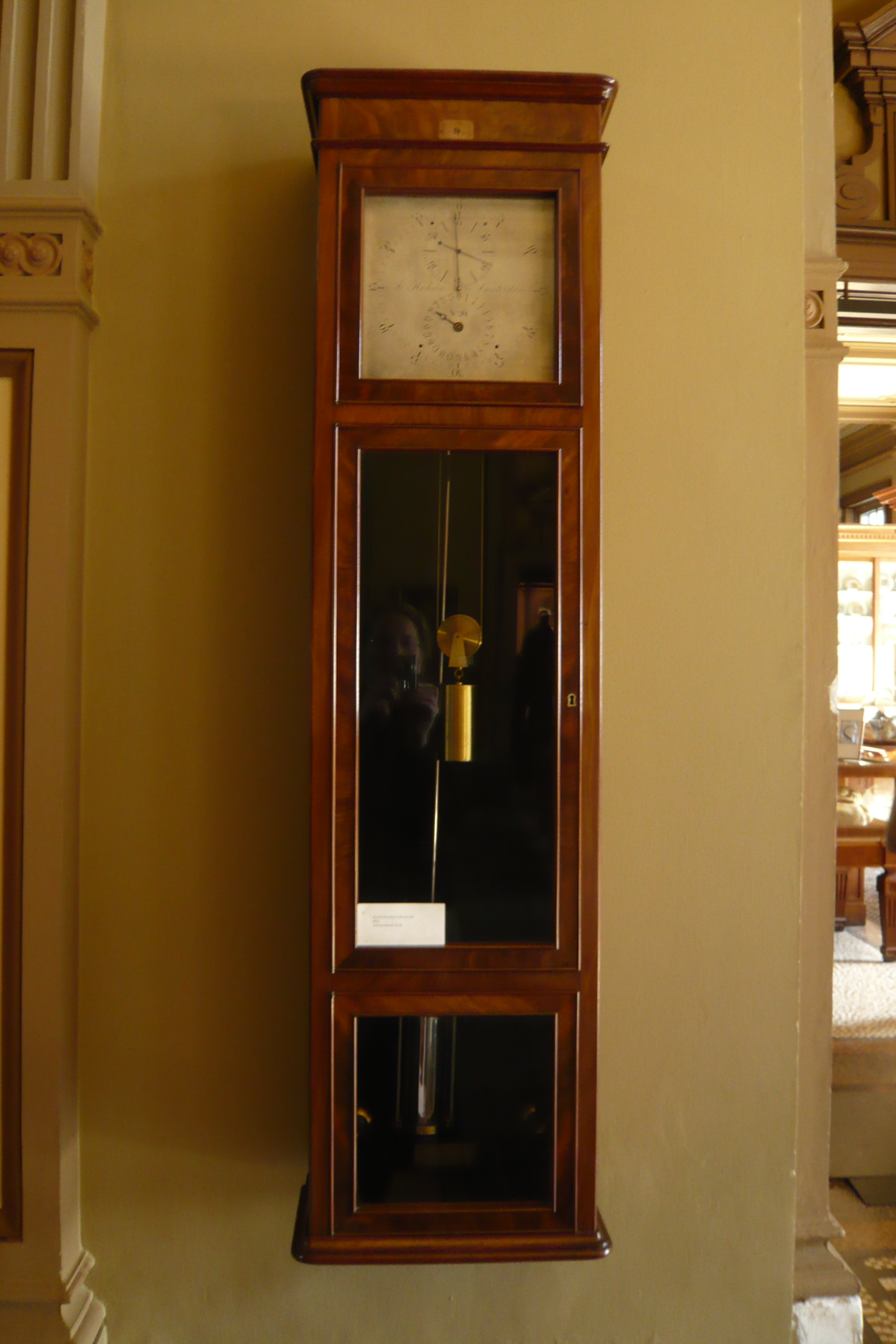
Andreas Hohwü Astronomical regulator in the collection of the Teylers Museum, 1865

Andreas Hohwü (July 18, 1803 in Gråsten – October 28, 1885) was a Danish clockmaker active in Amsterdam.

Andreas Hohwü was born in Gråsten (Duchy of Schleswig) on the border of Denmark and Germany. He was the son of the clockmaker Thomas Hohwü, and in 1829 he trained with Johann Heinrich Kessels (1781–1849) in Altona. In 1834 he travelled to Paris to study with Louis Breguet and worked in his workshop until 1839. In 1840 he moved to Amsterdam where he started his own workshop making clocks. His regulators were known for their precision and he supplied astronomical time-keepers all over Europe. He was awarded the Dutch honorary title orde van de Eikenkroon in 1849 and the title orde van de Nederlandse Leeuw in 1869.
