= Rinkenæs, Denmark =

Rinkenæs
- Town
- Location within Region of Southern Denmark Location within Denmark
- Coordinates: 54°53′54″N 9°33′35″E
- Country: Denmark
- Region: Southern Denmark
- Municipality: Sønderborg

Area
  - Urban: 1.1 km^{2} (0.42 sq mi)

Population (2026)
  - Urban: 1,279
  - Urban density: 1,200/km^{2} (3,000/sq mi)
- Time zone: UTC+1 (CET)
  - Summer (DST): UTC+2 (CEST)
- Postal code: DK-6300 Gråsten

Rinkenæs (German: Rinkenis) is a small town in Sønderborg Municipality, Region of Southern Denmark in Denmark. As of 1 January 2026, it had a population of 1,279.

Rinkenæs is situated just north of Flensborg Fjord (Flensburg Firth) 4 km southwest of Gråsten.

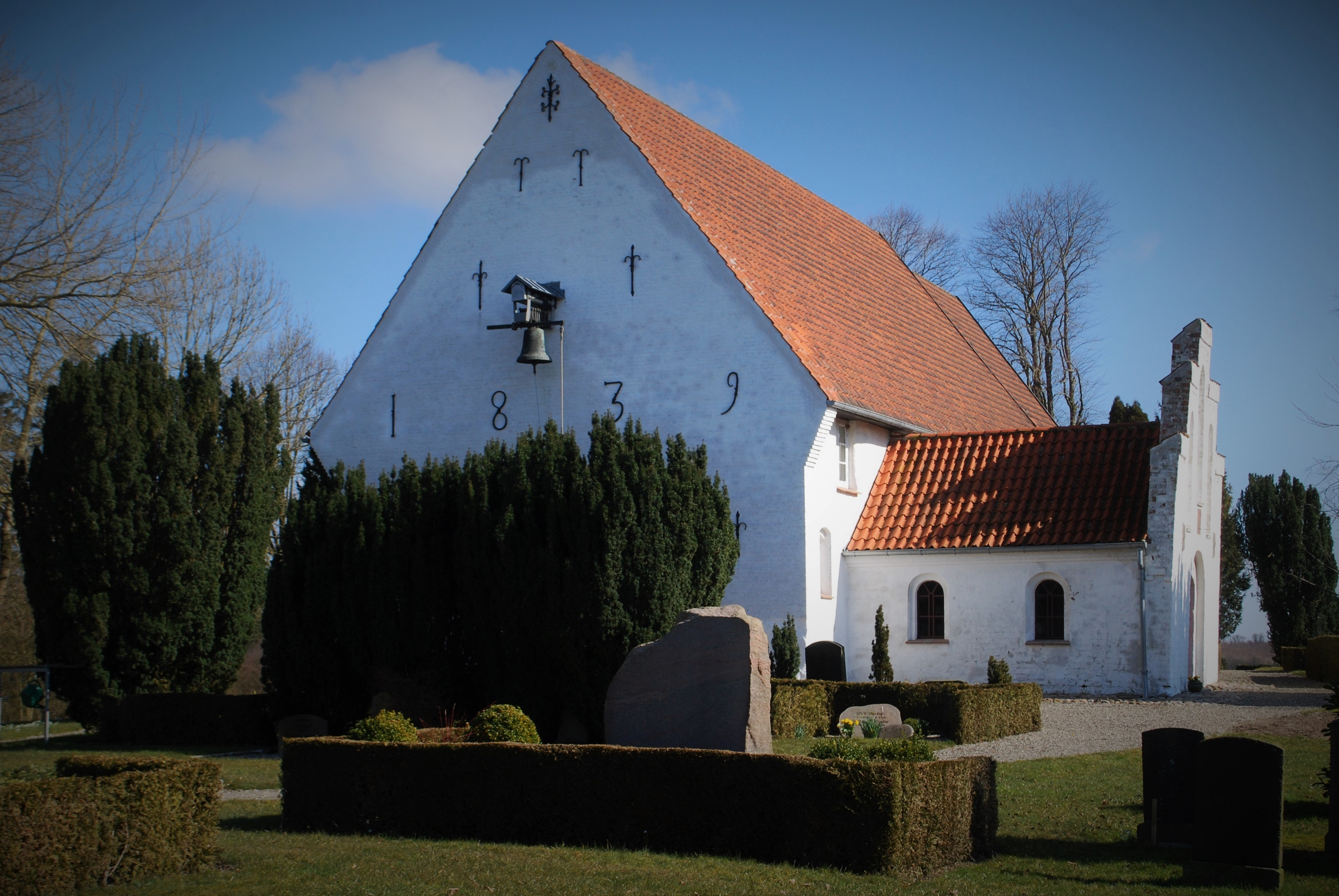
Rinkenæs Gl. Kirke (Rinkenæs Old Church)

Rinkenæs Gl. Kirke (Rinkenæs Old Church) is located at the top of a hill 4 km north of the town. It is one of the oldest churches in Denmark, built in 1158 in the Romanesque/Norman style.

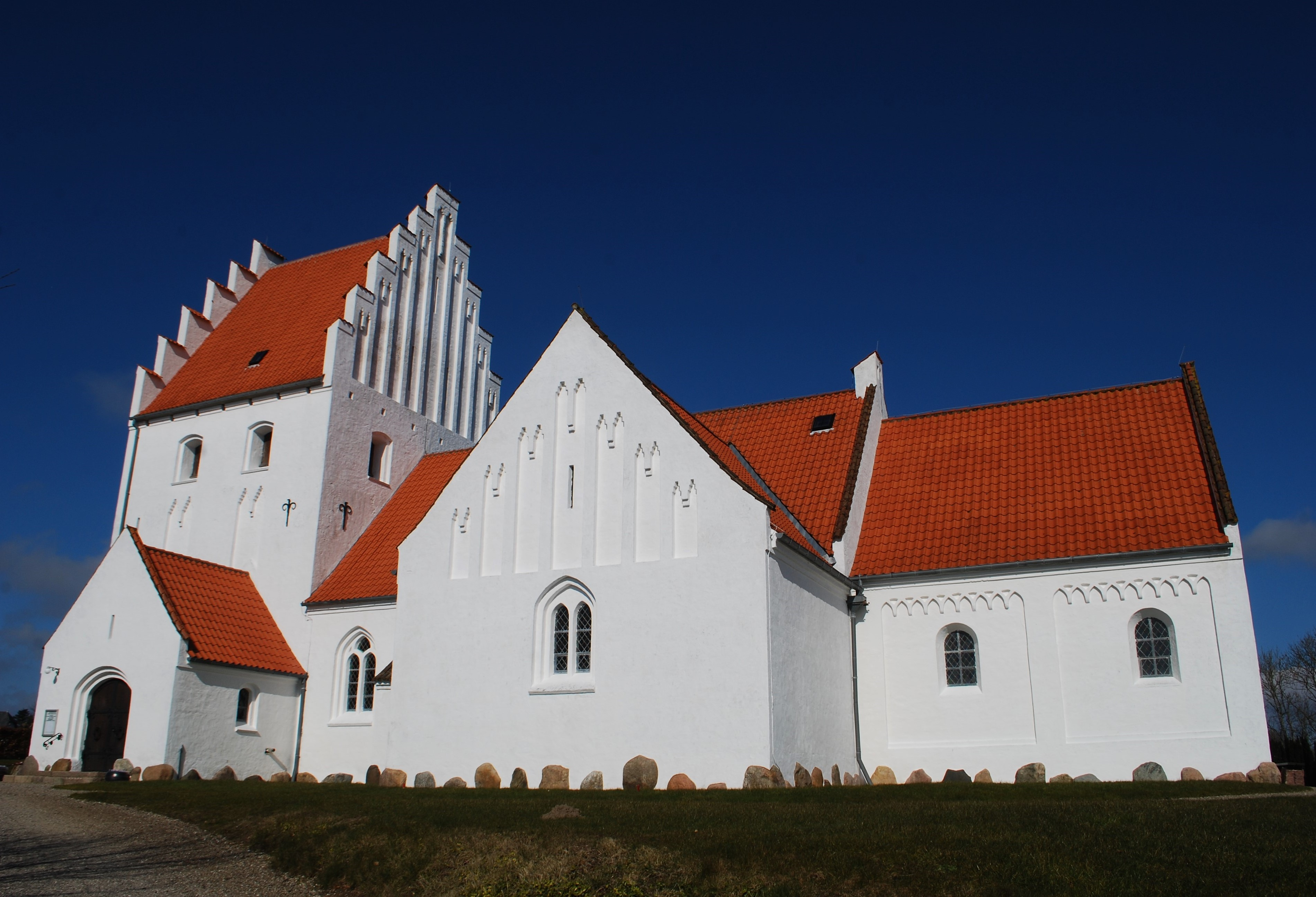
Rinkenæs Korskirke

Rinkenæs Korskirke (Rinkenæs Crosschurch), built 1928-32 in the style of a traditional Danish village church, is located in the town.
