= Broager Municipality =

Former municipality of Denmark

Coordinates: 54°53′0″N 9°41′0″E

Broager Municipality is a former Danish municipality (Danish, kommune). The municipality covered an area of 43 km^{2}, and had a total population of 6,290 (2005). Its last mayor was Jørn Lehmann Petersen, a member of the Social Democrats (Socialdemokraterne) political party.

The municipality was established in 1922 by merging Egernsund and Broager parishes. The municipality escaped further municipal reforms in 1970 as its population was then over 6,000 inhabitants. However, Broager municipality ceased to exist due to Kommunalreformen ("The Municipality Reform" of 2007). It was combined with Augustenborg, Gråsten, Nordborg, Sundeved, Sydals, and Sønderborg municipalities to form the new Sønderborg municipality. This created a municipality with an area of 499 km^{2} and a total population of 49,886 (2005).

Broager Municipality consisted solely of the namesake Broager Peninsula
