= Lysabild =

- Village
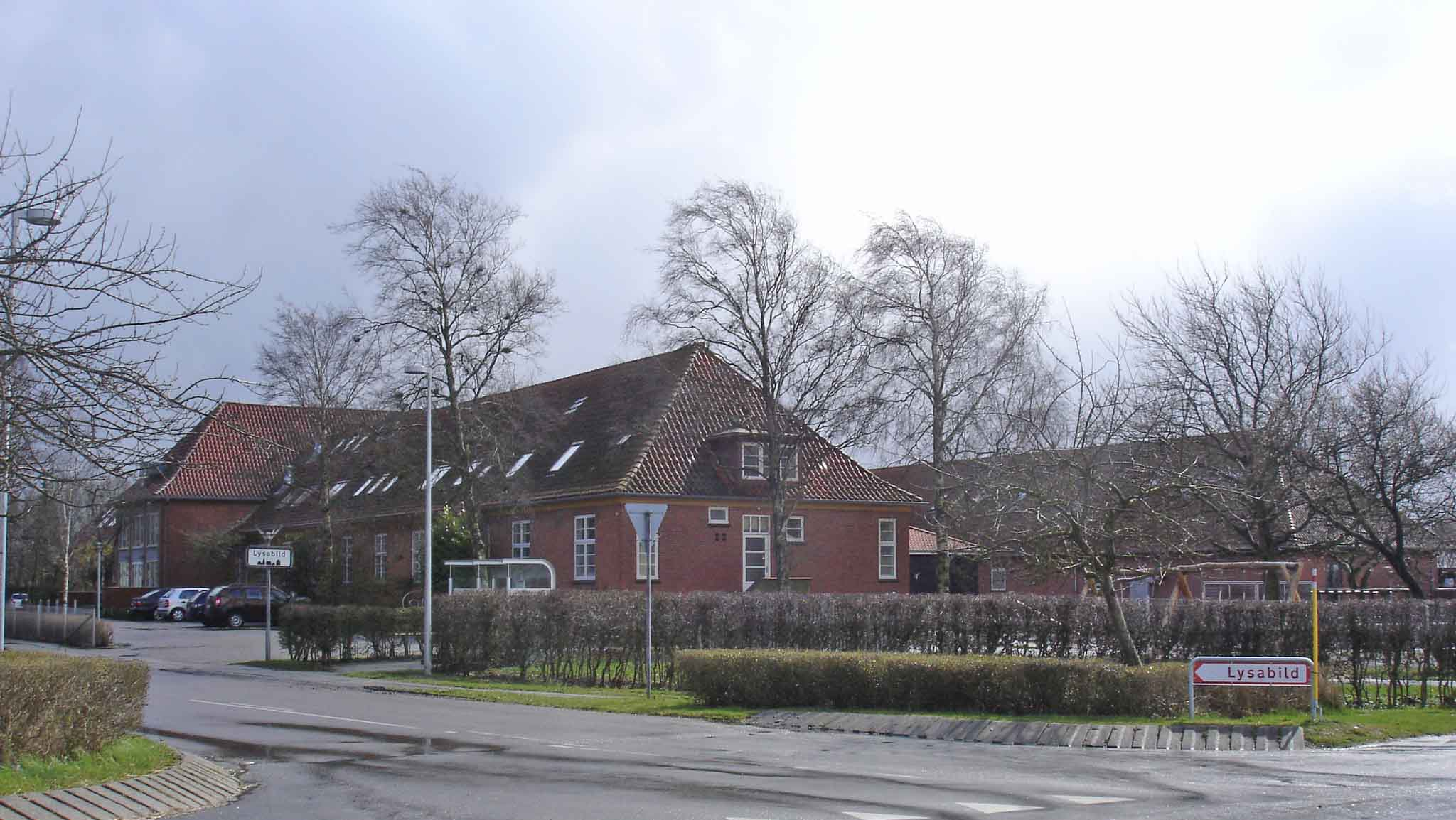
- Lysabild School

- Location within Region of Southern Denmark Location within Denmark
- Coordinates: 54°54′1″N 10°0′26″E
- Country: Denmark
- Region: Southern Denmark
- Municipality: Sønderborg

Population (2026)
  - Total: 519

Lysabild (German: Lysabbel) is a village, with a population of 519 (1 January 2026), in Sønderborg Municipality, Region of Southern Denmark in Denmark.

Lysabild is situated on the island of Als 19 km east of Sønderborg.

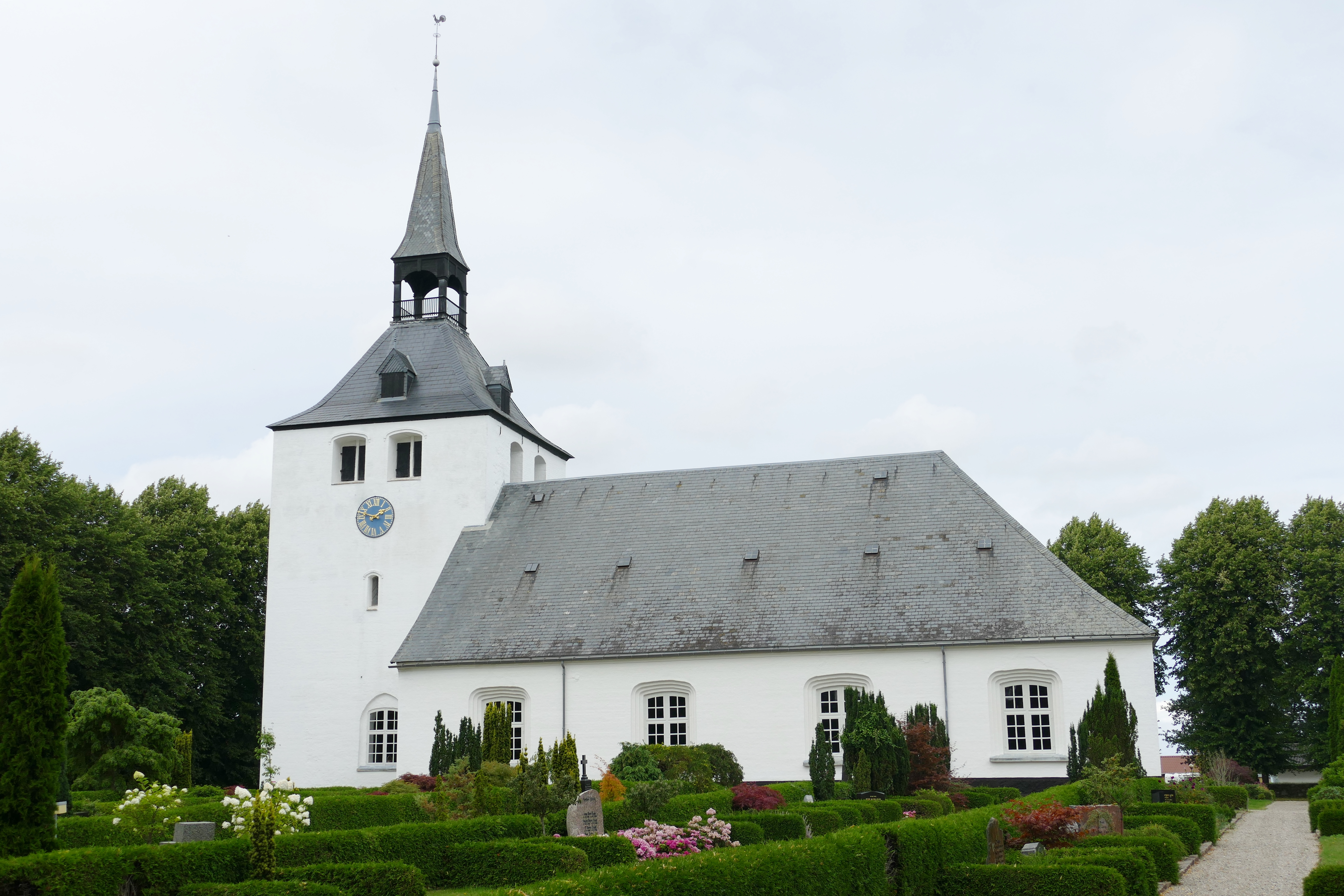
Lysabild Church

Lysabild Church, built in the late 12th century, is located in the village.
