= Nordborg =

Town in Denmark

- Town
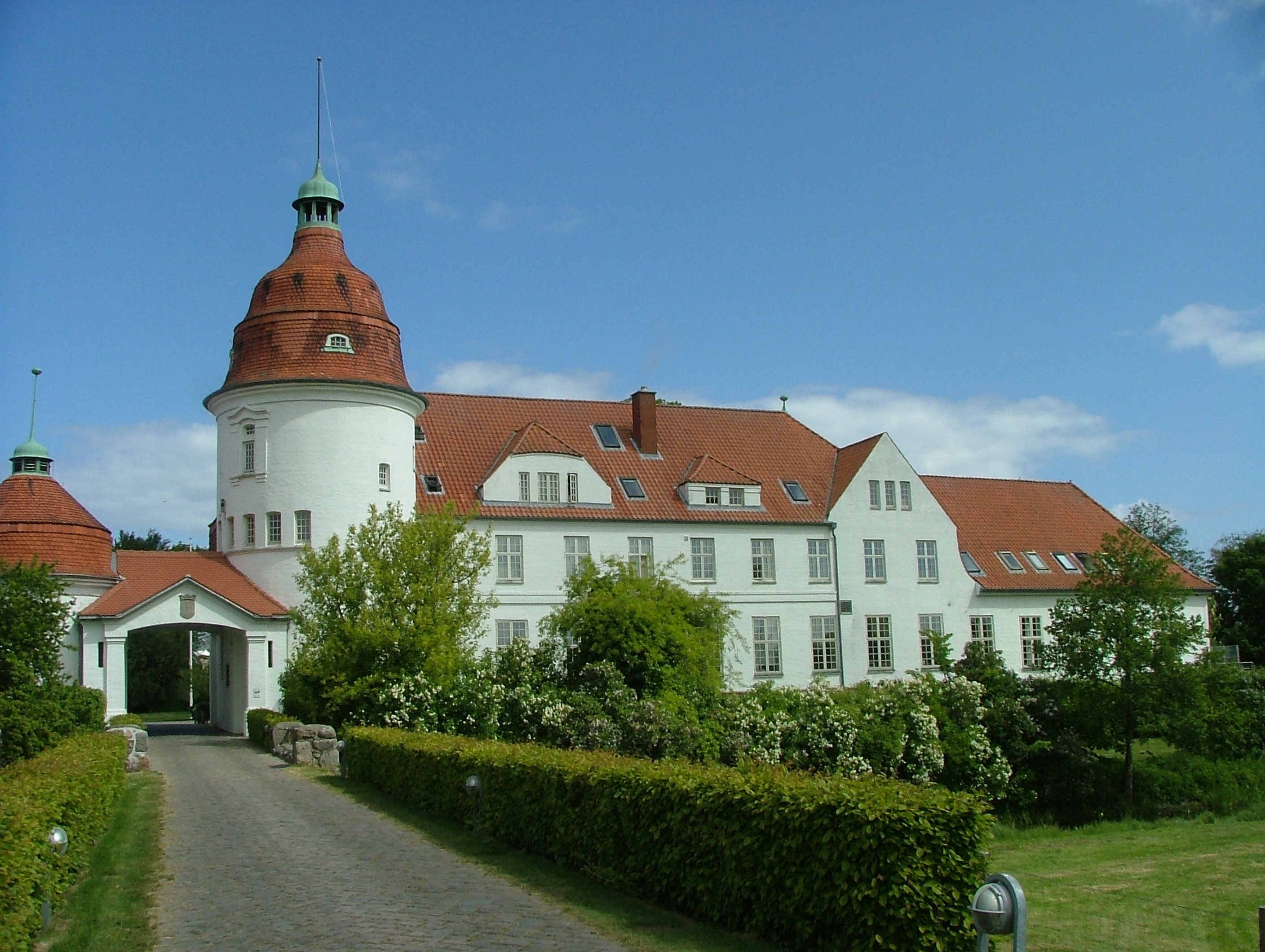
- Nordborg Castle

- Location in Denmark Nordborg (Region of Southern Denmark)
- Coordinates: 55°3′32″N 9°44′53″E
- Country: Denmark
- Region: Southern Denmark
- Municipality: Sønderborg

Area
  - Urban: 5.24 km^{2} (2.02 sq mi)

Population (2026)
  - Urban: 5,661
  - Urban density: 1,080/km^{2} (2,800/sq mi)
  - Gender: 2,803 males and 2,858 females
- Time zone: UTC+1 (CET)
  - Summer (DST): UTC+2 (CEST)
- Postal code: DK-6430 Nordborg

Nordborg (German: Norburg), is a town with a population of 5,661 (1 January 2026), which was the seat of the former Nordborg municipality (Danish, kommune) in Sønderborg Municipality, Region of Southern Denmark on the northwest half of the island of Als off the east coast of the Jutland peninsula in south Denmark.

Within the town is Nordborg Castle, a historic castle whose premises are currently used as a boarding school.

The town has been greatly influenced by the presence of Danfoss, a global producer of components for refrigeration and airconditioning, heating and motion control applications, headquartered in the town and founded in 1933.

== Nordborg Municipality ==
The former Nordborg Municipality covered an area of 125 km^{2}, and had a total population of 13,956 (2005). Its last mayor was Jan Prokopek Jensen, a member of the Social Democrats (Socialdemokraterne) political party.

The municipality was created in 1970 as the result of a kommunalreform ("Municipality Reform") that merged a number of existing parishes:

- Egen Parish
- Havnbjerg Parish
- Nordborg Parish
- Oksbøl Parish
- Svenstrup Parish

Over the years the presence of Danfoss has made the former Nordborg Municipality, the site of one of the largest industrial workplaces in Denmark. In later years, the municipality saw the rise of another major industrial company, Linak, a global producer of electric linear actuator systems.

On 1 January 2007 Nordborg Municipality ceased to exist as the result of Kommunalreformen ("The Municipality Reform" of 2007). It was merged with Augustenborg, Broager, Gråsten, Sundeved, Sydals, and Sønderborg municipalities to form the new Sønderborg Municipality. This created a municipality with an area of 499 km^{2} and a total population of 49,886 (2005).

== Notable people ==
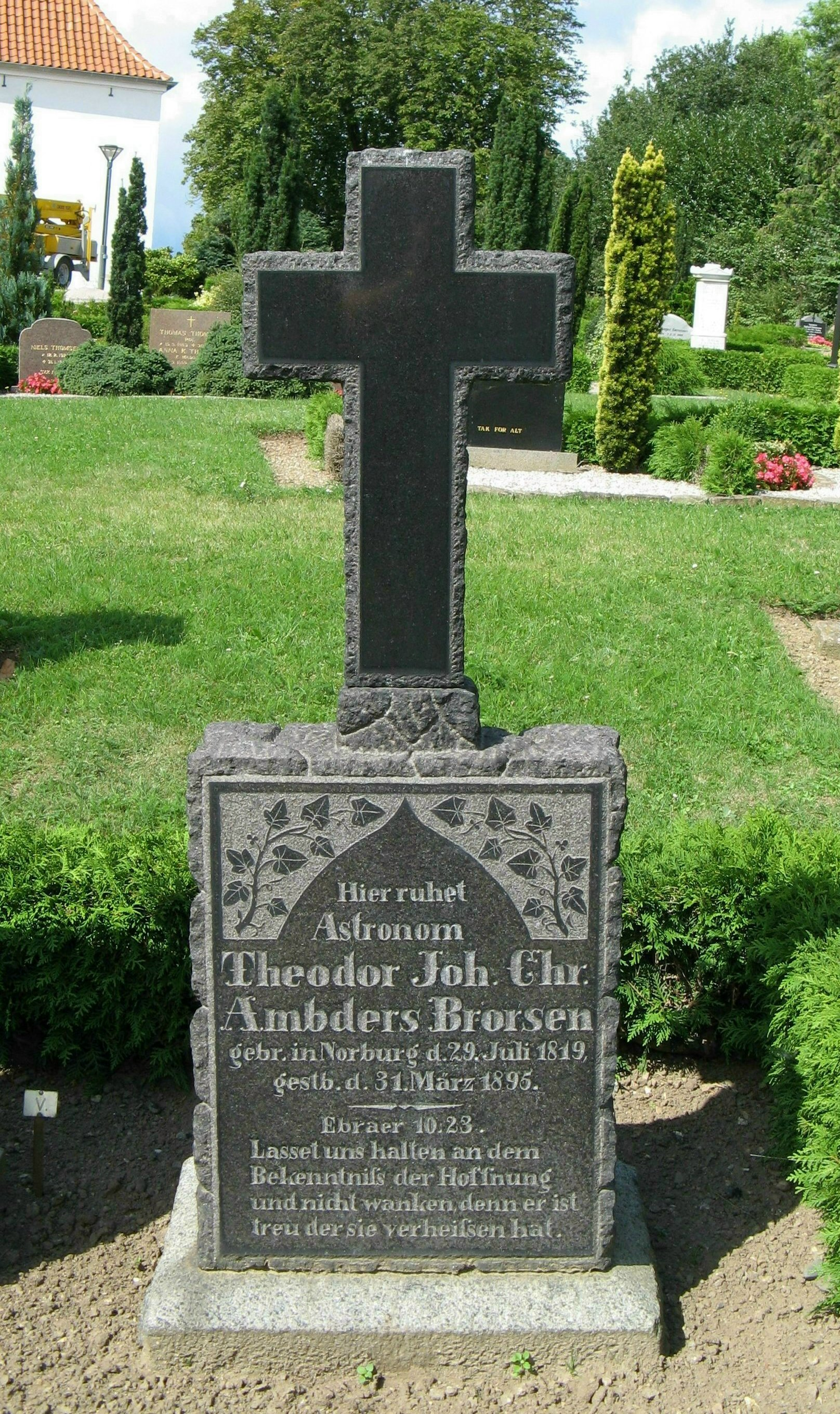
Grave of Theodor Brorsen in Nordborg cemetery

- Joachim Otto Voigt (1798 in Nordborg – 1843 in London) a Danish and German botanist and surgeon specializing in seed plants and pteridophytes
- Theodor Brorsen (1819 in Nordborg – 1895) a Danish astronomer, discovered five comets
- Hans Hartvig Møller (1873 in Nordborg – 1953) rector of Gammel Hellerup Gymnasium (1909-1943), founder of the first Scout patrol for boys in Denmark
- Arnold Burmeister (1899 in Nordborg – 1988) a decorated German general during World War II
- Bo Storm (born 1987 in Nordborg) a retired Danish footballer, currently the assistant manager of FC Roskilde
- Mads Clausen (1905 in Elsmark, parish of Havnbjerg – 1966) a Danish industrialist and founder of Danfoss
