= Hornbæk-Dronningmølle =

Seaside resort town in North Zealand, Denmark

- Urban area
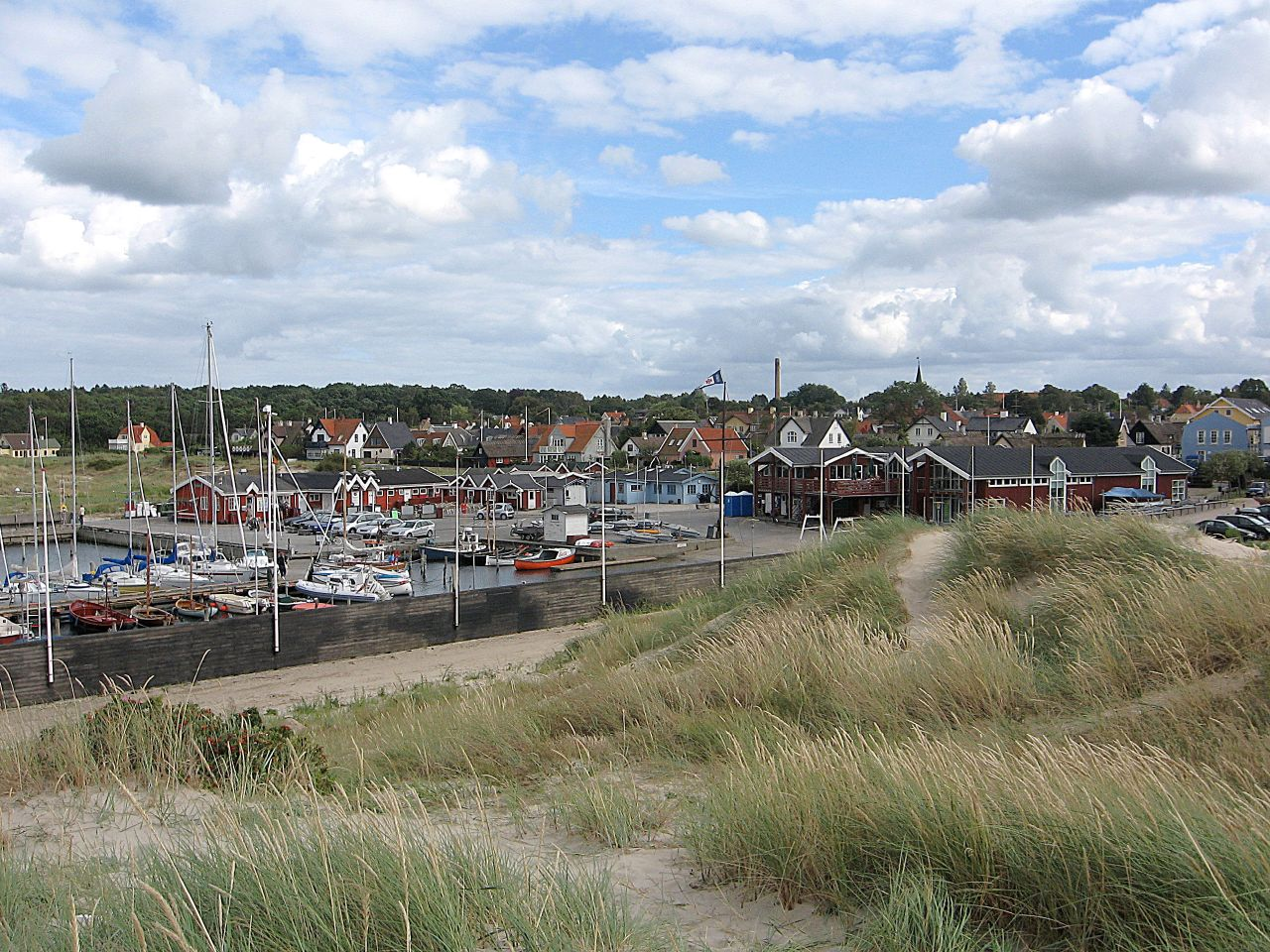
- Hornbæk Harbour

- Location in Denmark Hornbæk-Dronningmølle (Capital Region)
- Coordinates: 56°05′21″N 12°27′08″E
- Country: Denmark
- Region: Capital (Hovedstaden)
- Municipality: Helsingør; Gribskov

Area
  - Urban: 8.6 km^{2} (3.3 sq mi)

Population (2026-01-01)
  - Urban: 5,065
  - Urban density: 590/km^{2} (1,500/sq mi)
  - Gender: 2,413 males and 2,652 females
- Time zone: UTC+1 (CET)
  - Summer (DST): UTC+2 (CEST)
- Postal codes: 3100; 3120

Hornbæk-Dronningmølle (Danish pronunciation: [ˈhoɐ̯nˌpek tʁʌne̝ŋˈmølə]) is a seaside resort town on the north coast of the Danish island of Sjælland, consisting of the towns of Hornbæk and Dronningmølle. In these respective towns, it is part of Helsingør and Gribskov Municipality, in the Capital Region. Hornbæk-Dronningmølle is located on the Øresund midway between Gilleleje and Hellebæk and 22 km (14 mi) north of Hillerød.

Since 1 January 2010, Hornbæk and Dronningmølle has grown together, forming an urban area with a combined population of 5,065.
