= Guderup =

- Town
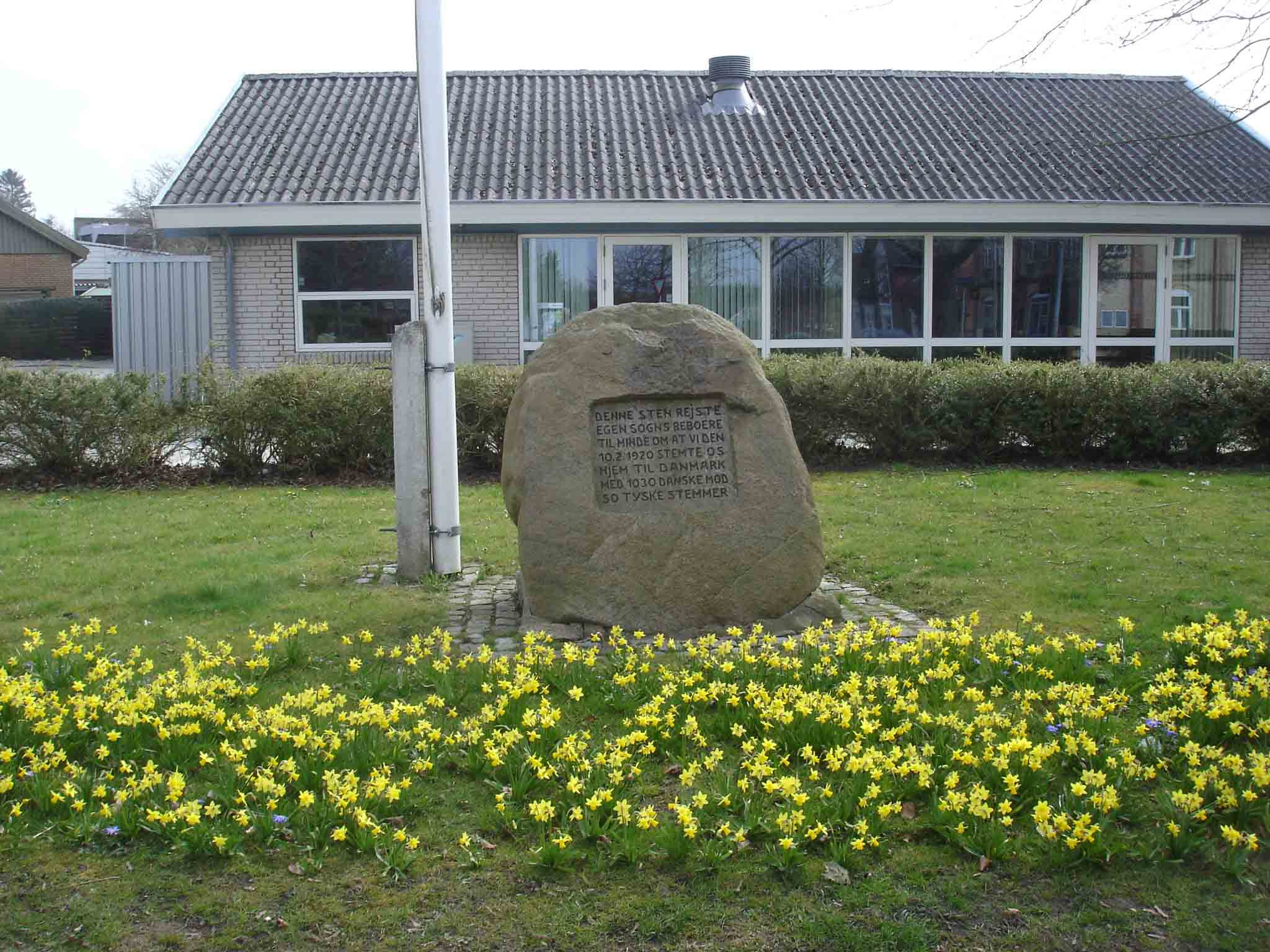

- Location in the Region of Southern Denmark
- Coordinates: 54°59′29″N 9°51′53″E
- Country: Denmark
- Region: Southern Denmark
- Municipality: Sønderborg

Area
  - Urban: 2 km^{2} (0.77 sq mi)

Population (2026)
  - Urban: 2,406
  - Urban density: 1,200/km^{2} (3,100/sq mi)
- Time zone: UTC+1 (CET)
  - Summer (DST): UTC+2 (CEST)

Guderup is a town located on the island of Als in south Denmark, in Sønderborg Municipality.
