= Høruphav =

- Town
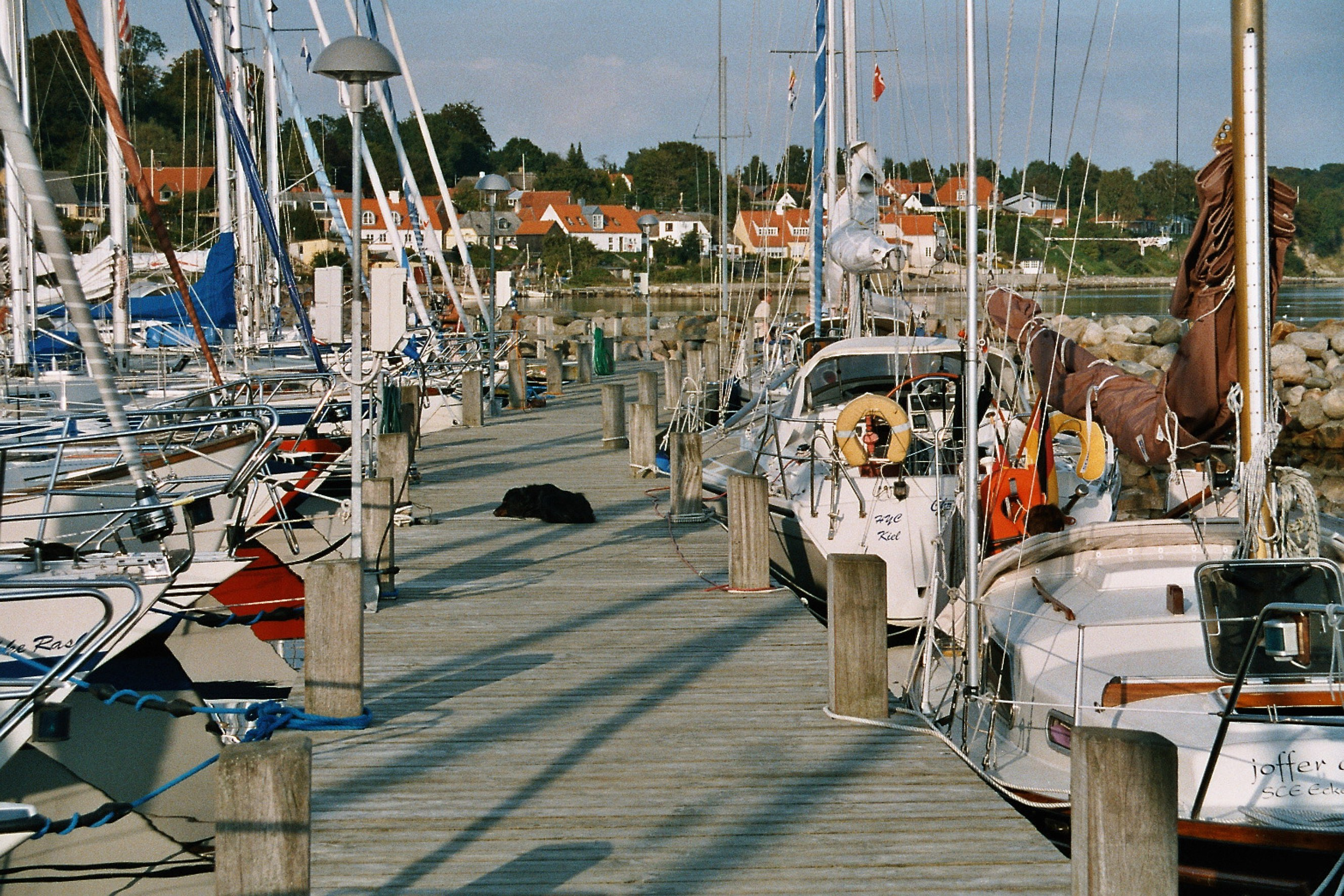

- Location in the Region of Southern Denmark
- Coordinates: 54°54′48″N 9°53′48″E
- Country: Denmark
- Region: Southern Denmark
- Municipality: Sønderborg

Area
  - Urban: 1.8 km^{2} (0.69 sq mi)

Population (2026)
  - Urban: 2,740
  - Urban density: 1,500/km^{2} (3,900/sq mi)
- Time zone: UTC+1 (CET)
  - Summer (DST): UTC+2 (CEST)

Høruphav is a small town located on the island of Als in south Denmark, in Sønderborg Municipality.

Before 2007, the town was the seat of the Sydals Municipality.

== Notable people ==
- Christian Gerthsen (1894 in Hörup, Alsen – 1956) a Danish-German physicist
