= Augustenborg, Denmark =

Augustenborg
- Town
- Augustenborg
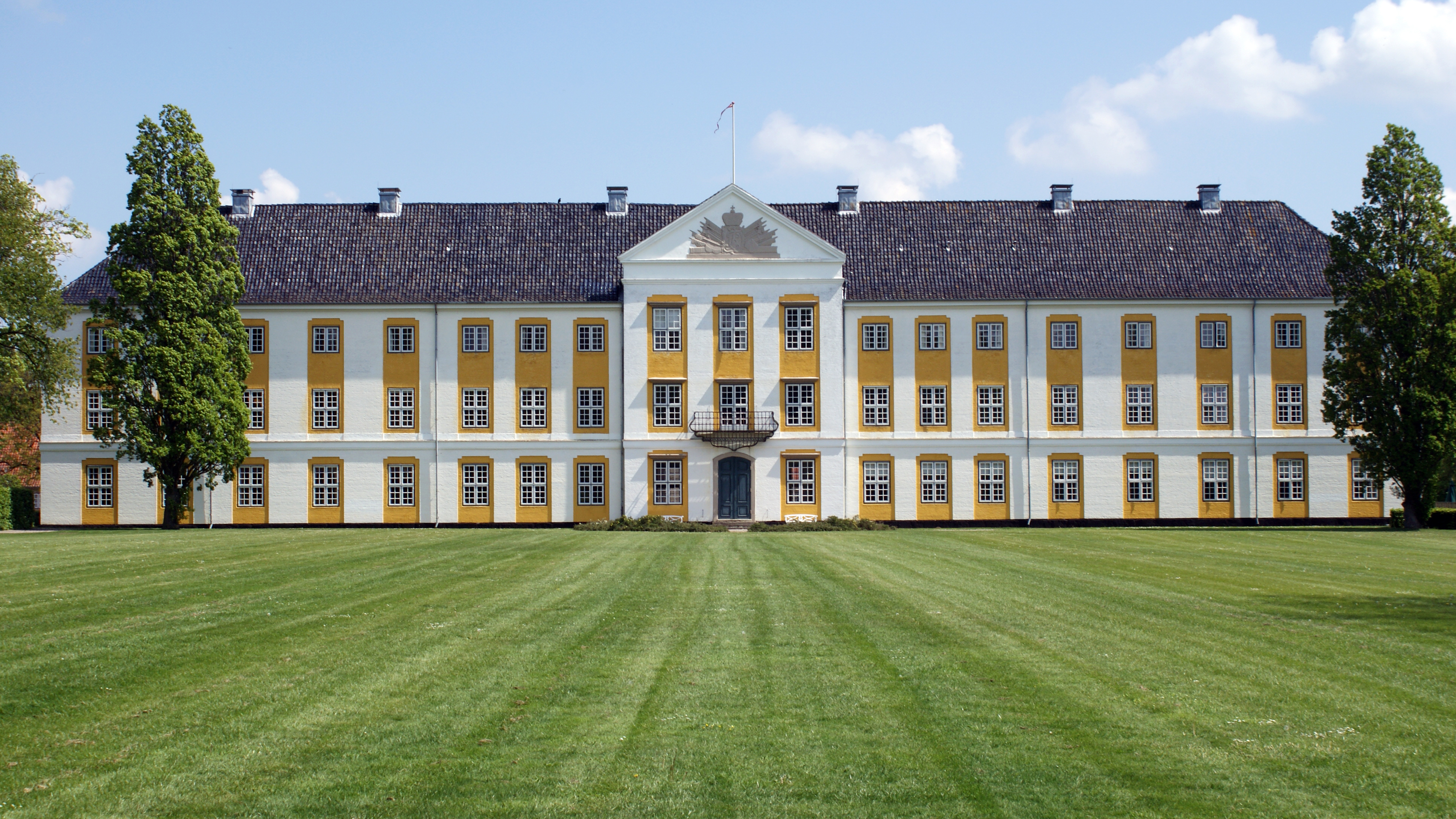

- Coat of arms

- Location in Denmark Augustenborg (Region of Southern Denmark)
- Coordinates: 54°56′50″N 9°52′17″E
- Country: Denmark
- Region: Southern Denmark
- Municipality: Sønderborg

Area
  - Urban: 2 km^{2} (0.77 sq mi)

Population (2026)
  - Urban: 3,164
  - Urban density: 1,600/km^{2} (4,100/sq mi)
- Time zone: UTC+1 (CET)
  - Summer (DST): UTC+2 (CEST)
- Postal code: DK-6440 Augustenborg

Augustenborg (German: Augustenburg) is a town on Als Island in Sønderborg Municipality, Region of Southern Denmark in Denmark. The town lies at the head of Als Fjord. To the east is the Little Belt. Ferry service connects Augustenborg to the island of Funen from the nearby town of Fynshav.

Augustenborg has a population of 3,164 (1 January 2026). It was the main town of Augustenborg Municipality until its merger into Sønderborg Municipality in 2007.

== History ==
The town grew up around Augustenborg Palace which was established by Ernest Günther, a member of the ducal house of Schleswig-Holstein (its branch of Sønderborg) and a cadet of the royal house of Denmark, in the years after 1651. The palace, and the town consequently, received the name in honor of Ernest's wife Auguste, herself also from a branch of dukes of Schleswig-Holstein.

The palace became the chief seat of their line which used the name Augustenborg as its branch name. Later, a Danish king made the head of that line specifically Duke of Augustenborg. They grew in relative prominence in late 18th century, and in the 19th century Schleswig-Holstein Question, being the symbols of pro-German nationalistic movement in Schleswig-Holstein. The area was annexed by Prussia in 1864 from Denmark, but was returned in 1920 following a plebiscite.

The Augustenborg male line died out in 1931, upon the death of Albert, Duke of Schleswig-Holstein, a grandson of Queen Victoria. Their female-line descendant today holds the throne of Sweden.

== Other notable people ==
This list excludes members of the nobility of the House of Schleswig-Holstein-Sonderburg-Augustenburg, some of whom were born at Augustenborg Palace. They can be seen using this link:

- Richard Parkinson (1844 in Augustenburg, Als Island – 1909), a Danish explorer and Anthropologist
- Johannes Streich (1891 in Augustenburg – 1977), a German general in the Wehrmacht during WWII and veteran of WWI. During the early stages of the North African Campaign he was sacked for his poor performance during the Siege of Tobruk
- Bjørn Paulsen (born 1991 in Augustenburg), a footballer who plays for Swedish side Hammarby IF, over 260 club caps
