= Gråsten =

Gråsten German: Gravenstein
- Town
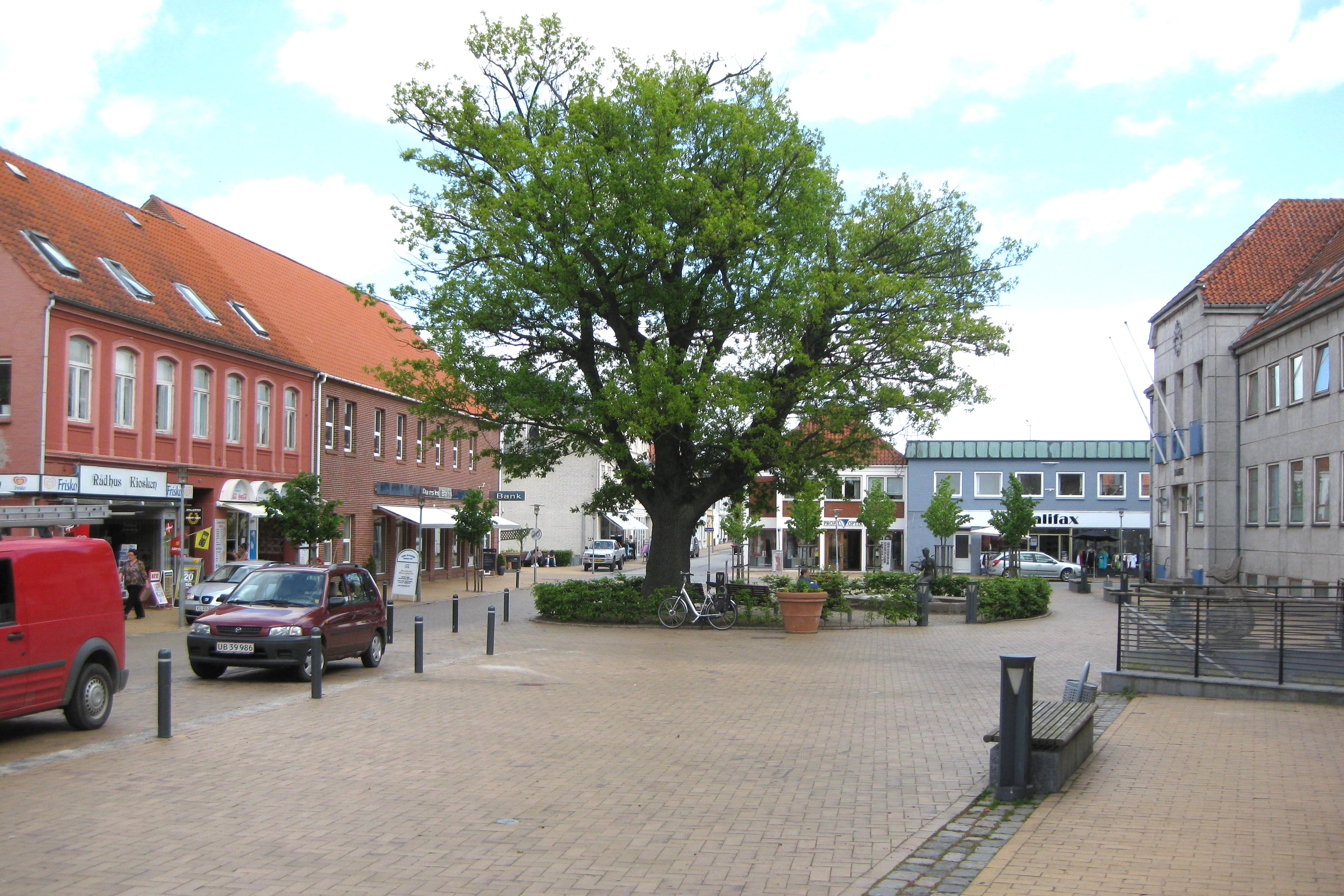

- Location within Denmark Location within Region of Southern Denmark
- Coordinates: 54°55′11″N 9°35′31″E
- Country: Denmark
- Region: Southern Denmark (Syddanmark)
- Municipality: Sønderborg

Area
  - Urban: 3.43 km^{2} (1.32 sq mi)

Population (2026)
  - Urban: 4,291
  - Urban density: 1,250/km^{2} (3,240/sq mi)
  - Gender: 2,092 males and 2,199 females
- Time zone: UTC+1 (CET)
  - Summer (DST): UTC+2 (CEST)

Gråsten (Danish pronunciation: [kʁɔˈste̝ˀn]; German: Gravenstein) is a town with a population of 4,291 (1 January 2026) on the east coast of the Jutland peninsula in south Denmark by the Nybøl Nor at an inlet of the Flensburg Fjord. It belongs to the Sønderborg municipality in Region of Southern Denmark. The town is located almost exactly at the center of a triangle defined by the towns of Aabenraa, Flensburg and Sønderborg Castle (Sønderborg Slot).

The Egernsund Bridge, which crosses the Egern Strait, connects Gråsten with the town of Egernsund. Gråsten is served by Gråsten railway station, located on the Sønderborg railway line.

The Gravenstein apple originates from the town.

== Gråsten municipality ==
Until 1 January 2007 Gråsten was the seat of the former Gråsten municipality (Danish, kommune) in South Jutland County, covering an area of 57 km^{2}, and with a total population of 7,256 (2005). Its last mayor was Bendt Olesen, a member of the Social Democrats (Socialdemokraterne) political party. The municipality was created in 1970 due to a kommunalreform ("Municipality Reform") that combined the following parishes: Gråsten, Kværs, Rinkenæs, and Adsbøl.

Gråsten municipality ceased to exist due to Kommunalreformen ("The Municipality Reform" of 2007). It was combined with Augustenborg, Broager, Nordborg, Sundeved, Sydals, and Sønderborg municipalities to form the new Sønderborg municipality. This created a municipality with an area of 499 km^{2} and a total population of 49,886 (2005).

== Famous residents of Gråsten ==
The Danish royal family has their summer residence, Gråsten Palace, in the town

=== Other notable people ===
- Andreas Hohwü (1803–1885), a Danish clockmaker active in Amsterdam
- Adolf Ditlev Jørgensen (1840–1897), Danish historian and archivist
- Margarete Mitscherlich-Nielsen (1917–2012), German psychoanalyst
- Anne Wolden-Ræthinge (1929–2016), Danish journalist, known by the pseudonym Ninka
