= Augustenborg Municipality =

Former municipality in Sønderjylland, Denmark

Coordinates: 54°57′01″N 9°52′59″E

Augustenborg Municipality was, until 1 January 2007, a municipality (Danish, kommune) in South Jutland County on the island of Als off the east coast of the Jutland Peninsula in south Denmark. The municipality covered an area of 53 km^{2}, and had a total population of 6,577 (2005). Its latest mayor was Åse Nygaard. The site of its municipal council was the town of Augustenborg.

Augustenborg ceased to exist due to Kommunalreformen ("The Municipality Reform" of 2007). It was combined with former Broager Municipality, Gråsten Municipality, Nordborg Municipality, Sundeved Municipality, Sydals Municipality, and Sønderborg Municipality to form the new Sønderborg Municipality. This created a municipality with an area of 499 km^{2} and a total population of 49,886 (2005).
