= Dreeshen =

Dreeshen is a surname. Notable people with the surname include:

- Devin Dreeshen (born 1987/88), Canadian politician
- Earl Dreeshen (born 1953), Canadian politician

== See also ==
- Dreesen
