= Max Uth =

German painter (1863–1914)

Gustav Alexander Max Uth
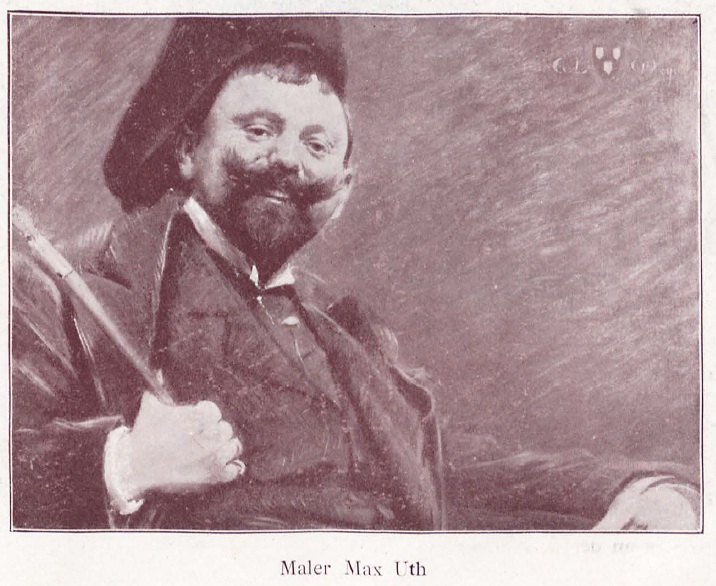
- Born: November 24, 1863; Berlin
- Died: June 15, 1914 (aged 50); Hermannswerder
- Education: Academy of Art, Berlin
- Known for: Landscape painting
- Movement: Berlin Secession
- Elected: Founding member of the Berlin Secession

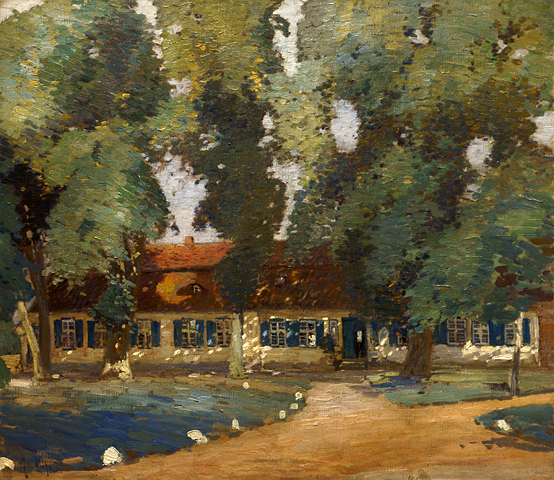
Landsitz in der Mark

Gustav Alexander Max Uth (24 November 1863 – 15 June 1914) was a German painter of landscapes and art teacher.

Uth was born in Berlin as the son of a manufacturer. He enrolled at the Academy of Art in Berlin under Eugen Bracht. He opened his own atelier for women painters in 1897 in Berlin; among his students were Gertrud Berger (1870–1949), Laura Schaberg (1860 or 1866–1935), Sophie Wencke-Meinken (1874–1963) and Emmy Gotzmann (1881–1950).

Paintings by Uth were among those exhibited in the AEG electricity pavilion at the Paris Exposition Universelle in 1900 and in the German Pavilion at the St. Louis World's Fair in 1904. He was one of the founding members of the Berlin Secession in 1899, and one of the sixteen artists to leave it in 1902. He died in 1914 in Hermannswerder, Potsdam.

== Notable works ==
- Am Bach. Sommerliche Stimmung, am Ufer eines Baches steht ein Angler. (n.d.; oil on canvas; 70 x 70 cm)
- Landsitz in der Mark. (ca. 1900; oil on canvas; 88 x 99 cm)
- Der Biergarten. (ca. 1910; oil on canvas; 75,5 x 85 cm)
- Dünenlandschaft. (oil on canvas; 40 x 54 cm)
