= Rugard =

Coordinates: 54°25′4″N 13°26′48″E

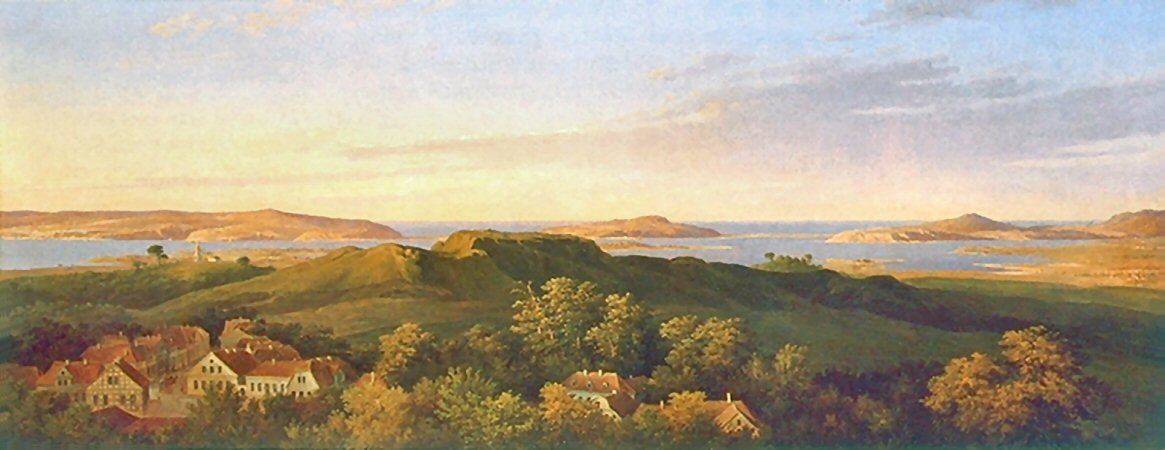
Der Rugard auf Rügen by Karl Friedrich Schinkel, 1821

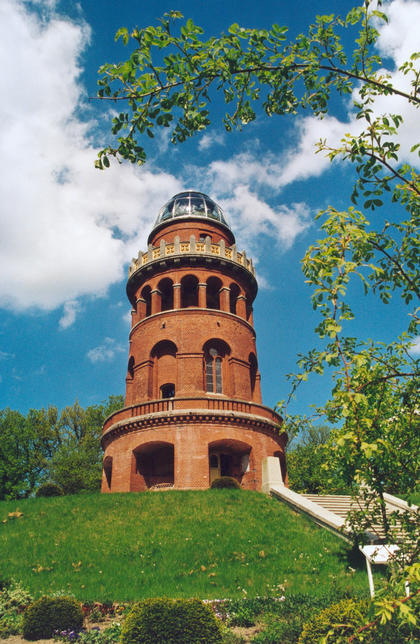
The Ernst Moritz Arndt Tower on the Rugard

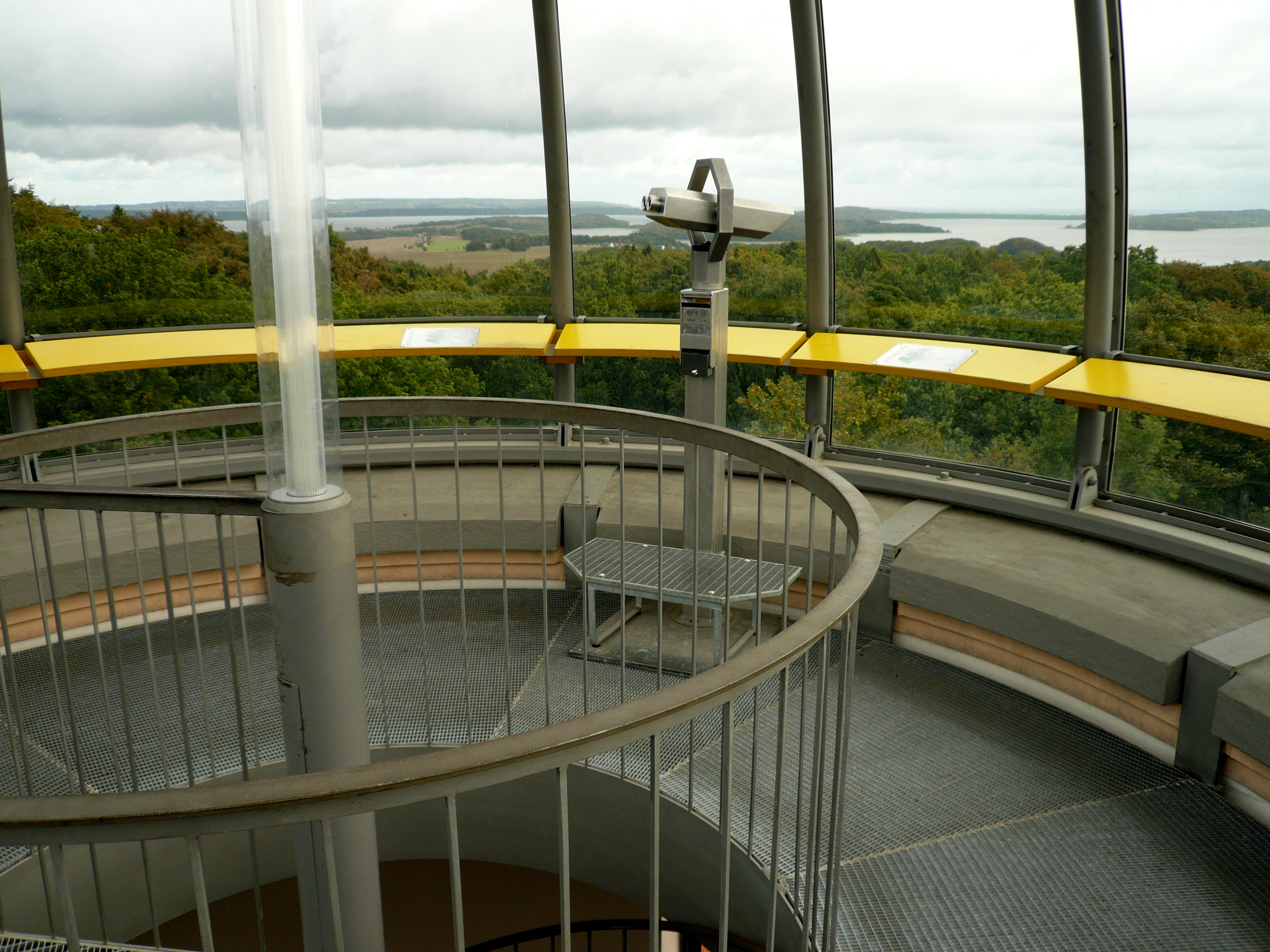
Viewing platform of the Ernst Moritz Arndt Tower

The Rugard, at 91 m above sea level (NN), is the highest elevation in the central region of the German Baltic Sea island of Rügen. This push end moraine was formed in the last ice age and lies on the northeastern perimeter of the town of Bergen auf Rügen. There was probably a castle here from the 9th century to the year 1325 A.D., in which princes of the Slavic Rani tribe resided. These princes ruled Rügen and parts of the adjacent mainland. The Slavic name Rugard (German: Rujanenburg) dates to that period. The site had an inner and outer ward and covered an area of 2.3 hectares.

When the Rani's princely line ended in 1325 with the death of Wizlaw III, the castle lost its importance and fell into disrepair. Some of its ramparts have survived, however, and may still be made out today. In the Middle Ages there was a mill here and the area was used for agriculture. Until 1830, when Prince Wilhelm Malte I of Putbus (1783-1854) had the ramparts reforested, the Rugard was treeless. Karl Friedrich Schinkel captured its former appearance in his 1821 painting Der Rugard auf Rügen ("The Rugard on Rügen").

Over time, a forest grew up, consisting mainly of spruce and pine trees, interrupted by small stands of oak, birch and poplar as well as many other deciduous and coniferous trees. The native beech is barely represented. In 1984, a 2.5 km nature trail was established that runs through the Rugard Forest (Rugardwald) where visitors are able to learn about the variety of animal and plant life in this historic countryside from the various information boards.

From the Ernst Moritz Arndt Tower on the top of the Rugard, visitors have a panoramic view over the entire island. This tower was built in the 1870s as a monument to Ernst Moritz Arndt, who was born in Groß Schoritz on Rügen. The foundation stone was laid on 26 December 1869, the 100th anniversary of the poet. They chose a design by Berlin architect and builder, Hermann Eggert, and began construction in Autumn 1872. However, the work was not completed until 1877 due to a lack of money. In the 1930s the forest around the Rugard reached such a height that there was no longer a clear, all-round view from the topmost gallery of the tower. Between 1935 and 1937, a Nazi Thingplatz was built here, which was mainly used by the Hitler Youth.

During thorough renovations carried out from 2000 to 2002, it was decided to replace the 1955 wooden dome with a dome of glass and steel (whilst maintaining its historical shape) and thus provide a higher viewing platform.
