= Max Delbrück (chemist) =

German agricultural chemist (1850–1919)

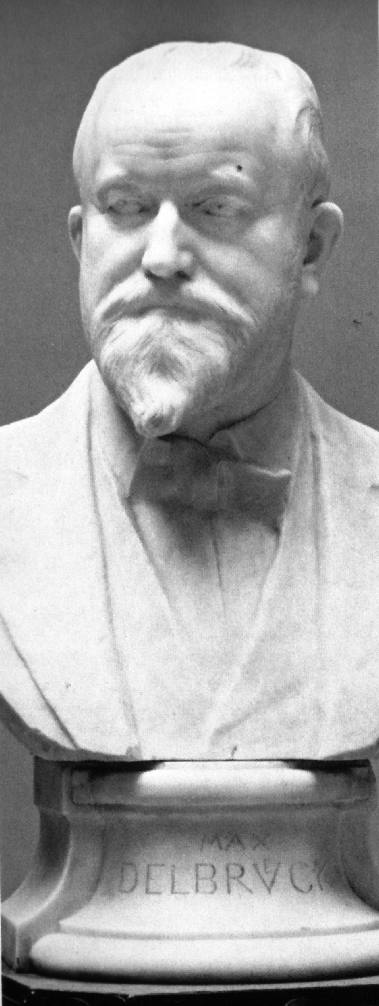
- Portrait bust
- Born: 16 June 1850; Bergen auf Rügen
- Died: 4 May 1919 (aged 68); Berlin

Max Emil Julius Delbrück (German: [maks ˈdɛl.bʁʏk]; 16 June 1850 – 4 May 1919) was a German agricultural chemist.

== Biography ==
Delbrück was born in Bergen auf Rügen. He studied chemistry in Berlin and in Greifswald. He was a member of the fraternity Free Corps of Cimbria. In 1872, he was made assistant at the Academy of Trades in Berlin.

== Career ==
In 1874, he was appointed head of the newly founded experimental facility of the Spirits and Liquor Trade Association of Germany. This facility was transformed and expanded in 1882 into the Research and Educational Institute for Brewing (VLB). Delbrück was head of the Institute of Fermentation Technology within the research institute.

In 1887, he was appointed instructor at the Agricultural College, and in 1899, was given a full professorship. He was founder of the Department of Machine-Aided Technologies of the VLB (1888) and partook in the conception of the degree course Brewmaster. The researches, carried out in part by Delbrück himself, in part under his guidance, resulted in technical contributions of the highest value to the fermentation industries.

He was one of the editors of the Zeitschrift für Spiritusindustrie (1867), and of the Wochenschrift für Brauerei. He died in Berlin, aged 68.

== Family ==
Delbrück came from a highly respected Prussian family of intellectuals and civil servants. He was a younger brother of the historian Hans Delbrück and uncle of the Nobel laureate physicist Max Delbrück.
