= Paul-Joachim Timm =

German politician (born 1990)

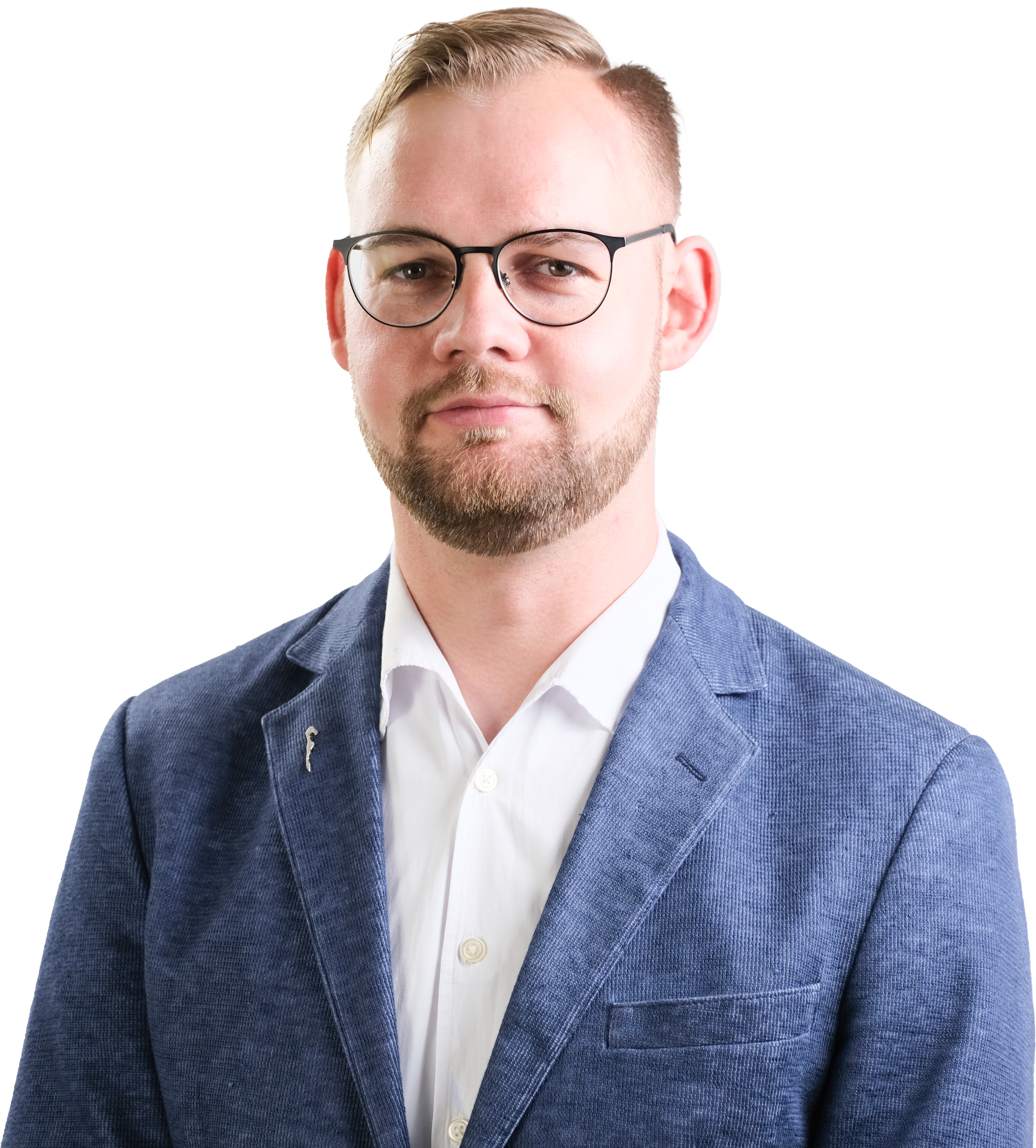
- Timm in 2021

Member of the Landtag of Mecklenburg-Vorpommern
- Incumbent
- Assumed office 26 October 2021

Personal details
- Born: 12 January 1990 (age 36) Bergen auf Rügen
- Party: Alternative for Germany

Paul-Joachim Timm (born 12 January 1990 in Bergen auf Rügen) is a German politician serving as a member of the Landtag of Mecklenburg-Vorpommern since 2021. He has served as group leader of the Alternative for Germany in the Kreistag of Nordwestmecklenburg since 2024.
