= Bergen auf Rügen =

Town in Mecklenburg-Vorpommern, Germany

- Town
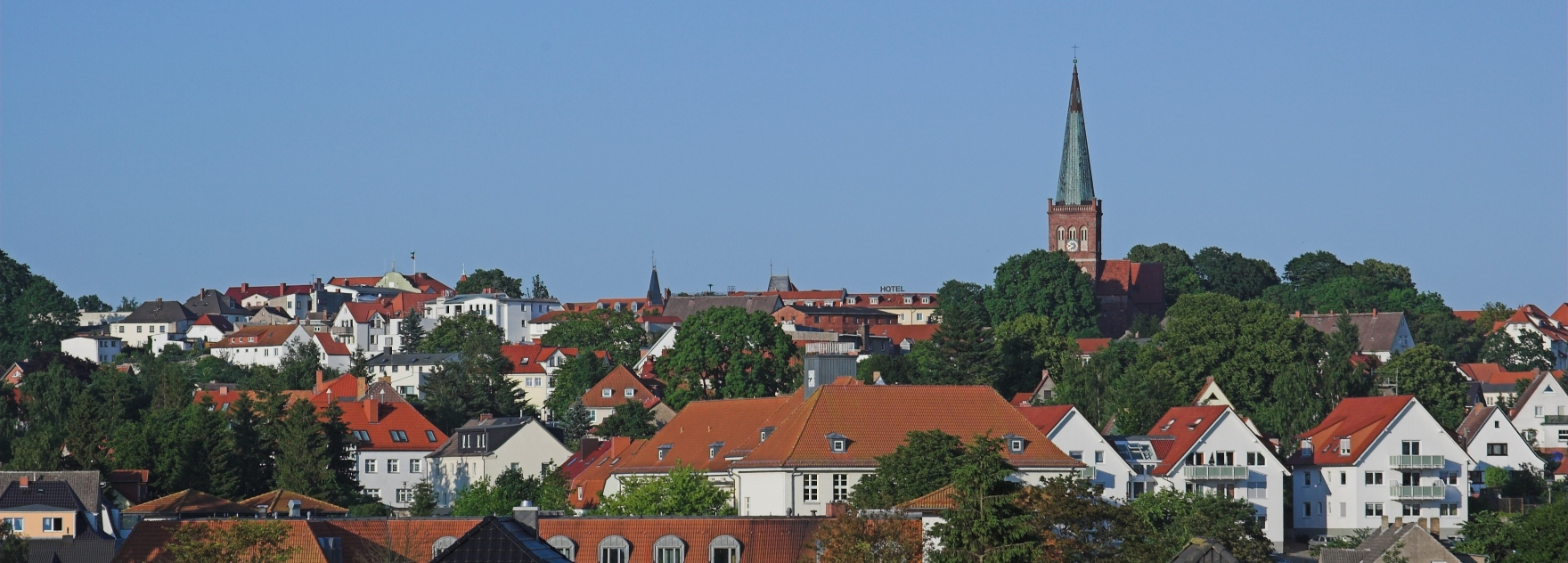
- Panorama

- Coat of arms

- Location of Bergen auf Rügen (dark red) in Amt Bergen auf Rügen (light red) in Rügen district (grey)
- Interactive map of Bergen auf Rügen
- Location within Germany Location within Mecklenburg-Vorpommern
- Coordinates: 54°25′N 13°26′E
- Country: Germany
- State: Mecklenburg-Vorpommern
- District: Vorpommern-Rügen
- Municipal assoc.: Bergen auf Rügen
- Founded: 1313
- Subdivisions: 13

Government
  - Mayor: Andrea Köster (CDU)

Area
  - Total: 51.49 km^{2} (19.88 sq mi)
- Elevation: 55 m (180 ft)

Population (2025-12-31)
  - Total: 13,394
  - Density: 260.1/km^{2} (673.7/sq mi)
- Time zone: UTC+01:00 (CET)
  - Summer (DST): UTC+02:00 (CEST)
- Postal codes: 18528
- Dialling codes: 03838
- Vehicle registration: RÜG
- Website: www.stadt-bergen-auf-ruegen.de

Bergen auf Rügen (German: [ˈbɛʁɡn̩ aʊf ˈʁyːɡn̩], lit. 'Bergen on Rügen') is the capital of the former district of Rügen in the middle of the island of Rügen in Mecklenburg-Western Pomerania, Germany. Since 1 January 2005, Bergen has been the administrative seat of the Amt of Bergen auf Rügen, which with a population of over 23,000 is Mecklenburg-Western Pomerania's most populous Amt.

== Geography ==
=== Location ===
Bergen is in the middle of Germany's biggest island, Rügen, on the Baltic Sea coast. The town lies in a hilly area, with the Rugard woods on the town's northeast outskirts reaching a height of 91 m above sea level. The area around Bergen is predominantly agricultural. The town itself is built on a glacial moraine deposited when the ice sheets retreated during the last ice age. Not far from central Bergen, to the northeast, is the Kleiner Jasmunder Bodden, a shallow bay, and to the southeast lies another bay, the Greifswalder Bodden, and with the town of Putbus.

South of the town is the Kiebitzmoor ("Peewit Moor") and to the northwest is the lake of Nonnensee which was restored a few years ago.

=== Subdivisions ===
The following wards are parts of Bergen:

- Bergen Süd
- Dumsevitz
- Kaiseritz
- Karow
- Kiekut
- Neklade
- Streu
- Tilzow
- Trips
- Zittvitz

=== Bergen Süd ===
Bergen Süd is the most populous district of Bergen. It consists mainly of plattenbau dwellings and was built in the mid-1960s. The buildings were renovated during the 1990s. Bergen Süd has one of the two cemeteries in the town and an industrial estate, where several car dealers, a social enterprise workshop for people with mental disabilities, the town cleaning department and other small companies are based.

=== Rotensee ===
Rotensee is the second most populous district in Bergen and is situated in the west of the town. Just like Bergen Süd, Rotensee is made of plattenbau houses, built in the 1980s. Not until 2000 were the first houses renovated. Due to the declining population of the town, a number of houses were demolished or dismantled. Rotensee has two day care centres, a regional day school, the socio-cultural community centre/"multi-generational house" (NBZ Rotensee) and a special-needs school.

=== Tetel ===
Tetel is the smallest district in Bergen. It is located southeast of Bergen auf Rügen near Zittvitz. Three families live in Tetel. The oldest house is about 120 years old.

== History ==
=== Name ===
The origin of the name stretches back to 1232 when there was a place on Rügen called Gora, a Slavic word for "mountain" (Berg in German) which came from the Polabian language spoken by the Rani (or Rujani), a Slavic people who once inhabited the area. The Roskilde Register (Roeskilder Matrikel) of 1294 mentioned the place as Villa Berghe. In 1278 it was called Berghe, in 1302 Bergh in Ruya and in 1306 Berghen. In 1314 it was mentioned in the records as villa montis.

On 6 November 1995, it was renamed from Bergen/Rügen to Bergen auf Rügen.

=== Middle Ages ===
Bergen's history goes back over one thousand years. The first settlements on the present day territory of Bergen are, however, considerably older. During the Early Middle Ages, Rügen was settled by a Slavic tribe, the Rani who established a pagan worship site on Cape Arkona, defended by a fort, the Jaromarsburg. In the area of present-day Bergen, a castle was established on the Rugard hill.

When the tribe was subdued by the Danes, who erected the Principality of Rügen ruled by a local dynasty, the Rugard burgh became an administrative centre. With Danish rule, the principality became Christian and subject to German immigration in the course of the Ostsiedlung. While the Rugard stronghold included a suburbium already, the town of Bergen was erected on the neighbouring hilltop and not within the ramparts of the Rugard, that today are preserved in a park north of the town centre.

Soon after the fall of the Jaromarsburg in 1168, construction started on St. Mary's as the palace church of the Rügen prince, Jaromar I. In 1193 the church, now consecrated and complete apart from the westwork, was turned into a Cistercian convent. Even today there is an unusual curiosity here: the clock face on the north side of the church tower shows 61 minutes. The foundation of the abbey encouraged the first inn to be built in 1232.

In 1325, Bergen, along with the Principality of Rügen, became part of the Duchy of Pomerania by inheritance. Until the 15th century, Bergen was under the monastery's administration. Fires, such as that in 1445, almost destroyed the entire town, the monastery and parts of the church.

=== Early Modern era ===
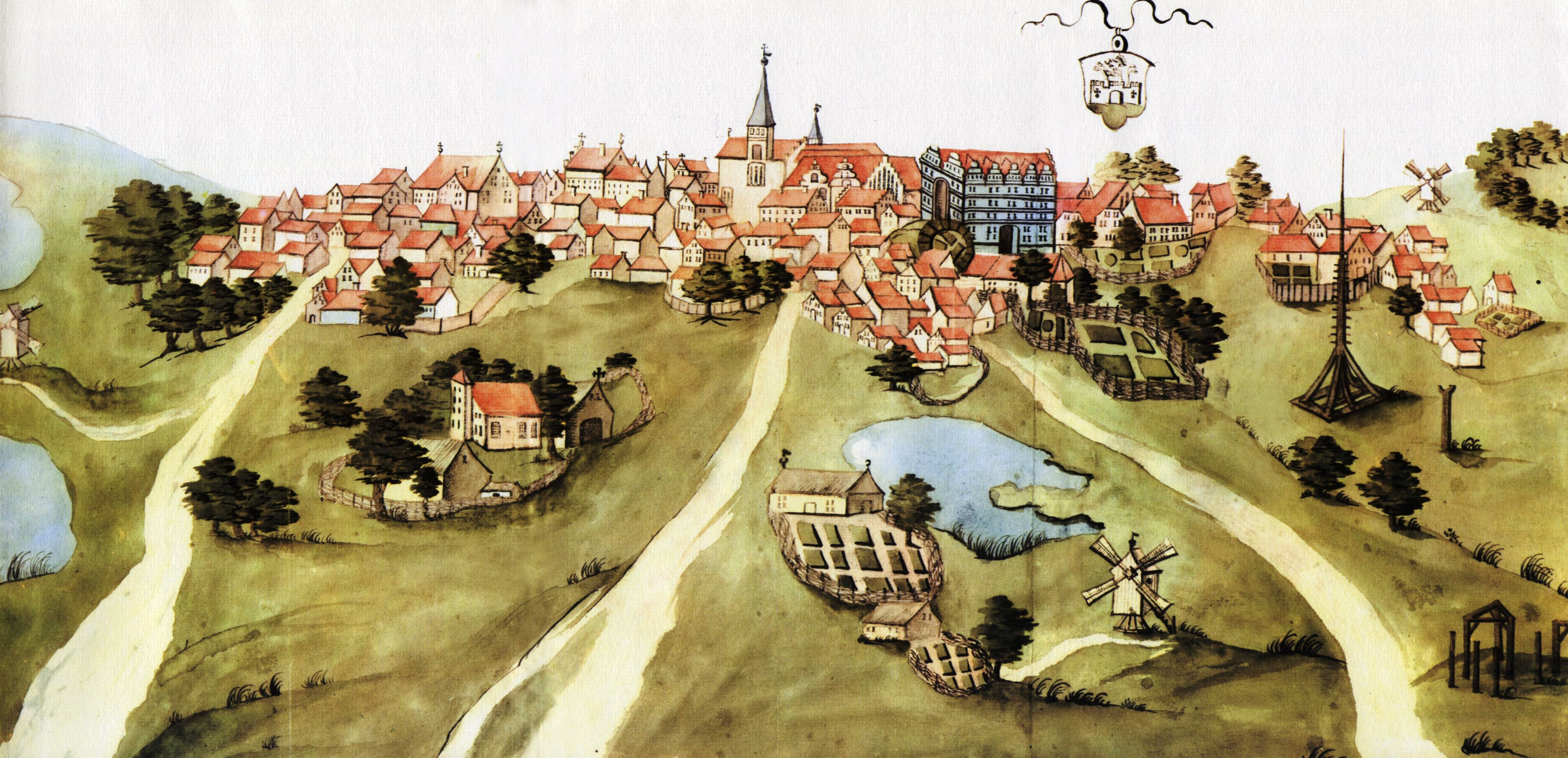
Bergen in 1615

In 1534, after a decree by the Pomeranian Landtag in Treptow an der Rega (today Trzebiatów), the Reformation was introduced to Pomerania. Ownership of the monastery was transferred to the Pomeranian dukes.

In 1613, Bergen was granted Lübeck law town rights. This is exceptional when compared with most other Pomeranian towns, which had already been granted town rights in the 13th century. After the Thirty Years' War, the town became Swedish as part of Swedish Pomerania in 1648. In 1815, it became part of the Prussian Province of Pomerania.

=== 19th century ===
The first industrial enterprises were established in 1823 and 1853, when leather factories set up shop here. In 1883, the first trains reached Bergen station on the railway from Altefähr. In 1890, the dairy began operations and the following year, the post office was built by the marketplace. When in 1898 and 1899, the waterworks and the power station came into operation, and the infrastructure that Bergen had at its disposal made it worthy of being the district seat.

=== 20th century ===
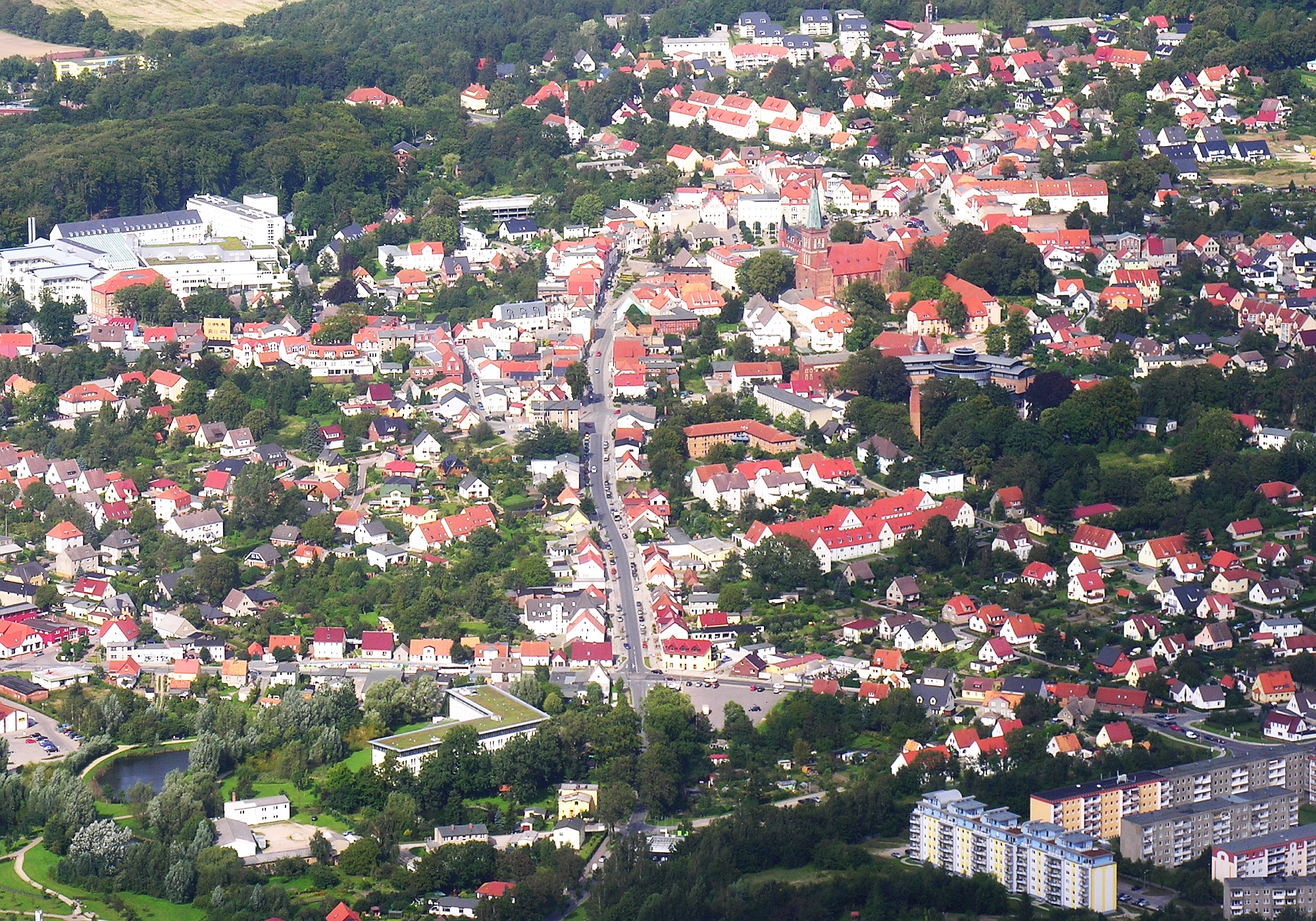
Aerial view over Bergen today

Four days before the end of the Second World War, undefended Bergen was occupied by the Red Army on 4 May 1945. After the German Democratic Republic (East Germany) was founded, the new government pressed ahead with further industrialization. In 1952, construction began on the industrial area on the town's western outskirts. From 1953 to 1958, the dairy was established, which furnished 300 tonnes of milk daily. In 1955–1956 came the establishment of the VEB Brot- und Backwaren (Bread and Baked Goods). In 1957–1958, the slaughterhouse and meat plant went into production. An efficient food industry was set up in Bergen, supplied from the island and parts of the mainland. Since Reunification and East Germany's accession into the Federal Republic, the town has undergone a number of marked changes. The population dwindled from its former level of almost 20,000 to 16,500. Many prefabricated concrete structures, common in the former Warsaw Pact countries, were modernized and adapted to new demands. In addition, a few schools were closed and new hotels built. Historical downtown was completely renovated and decorated, giving it a new appeal.

=== Population growth ===
Year	Population
1600	ca. 1,650
1630	just 400
1788	ca. 1,500
1890	4,000
1989	19,200
2000	15,615
2006	14,430

== Transport ==
- Bergen auf Rügen railway station is served by trains to and from Berlin, Cologne, Dresden, Düsseldorf, Frankfurt, Hamburg, Hannover, Prague, Rostock, Stralsund and Stuttgart.

Bergen has essentially good transport connections. This refers to travel on the island of Rügen and the national rail system. The road connection with the mainland, on the other hand, used to be very choked. In summer, the Rügen Causeway – the bridge that joins Rügen to the mainland at Stralsund often became a bottleneck. This has recently been alleviated by the new Strelasund Crossing – a second crossing over the Strelasund with an expressway feeder.

Individually, the road network serving Bergen is as follows. The B 96 reaches Bergen from Stralsund, where it connects with the B 105 which leads to Rostock. Bergen is also accessible by car by taking the ferry from Glewitz. In Bergen, the road further branches into the B 196, affording access to the island's eastern area, where there are bathing beaches. The B 96 itself leads further on to Sassnitz.

Those who would rather forgo the car may also reach Bergen by train. Already by the time the first stretches of railway were built on Rügen in 1883, trains were reaching the island from afar. The island's capital, Bergen, has always profited from this, as it lies right on the main transport arteries to the bathing resorts and the harbour at Mukran (Sassnitz).

All parts of the island of Rügen can also be reached from Bergen by the many buslines there.

Until the 1960s, Bergen was also served by a local narrow gauge railway, the Rügen Light Railway, popularly known as Rasender Roland ("Racing Roland"), but the Deutsche Reichsbahn, which owned it at the time, shut all the lines in the central and northern parts of Rügen down at that time. Part of the system still runs, however.

== Recreation ==
- Not far from the historic town centre is the Rugard Forest (Rugardwald). From the Ernst Moritz Arndt Tower, at 91 m above sea level, there is a stunning panoramic view far across Rügen.
- In the northern part of the Rugard Forest, a summer luge track was opened on 25 June 2005.
- Bergen Rotensee Socio-cultural Neighbourhood Centre, since February 2005 with club-cinema. Readings, concerts and creative arts are held here.

== Culture and sights ==
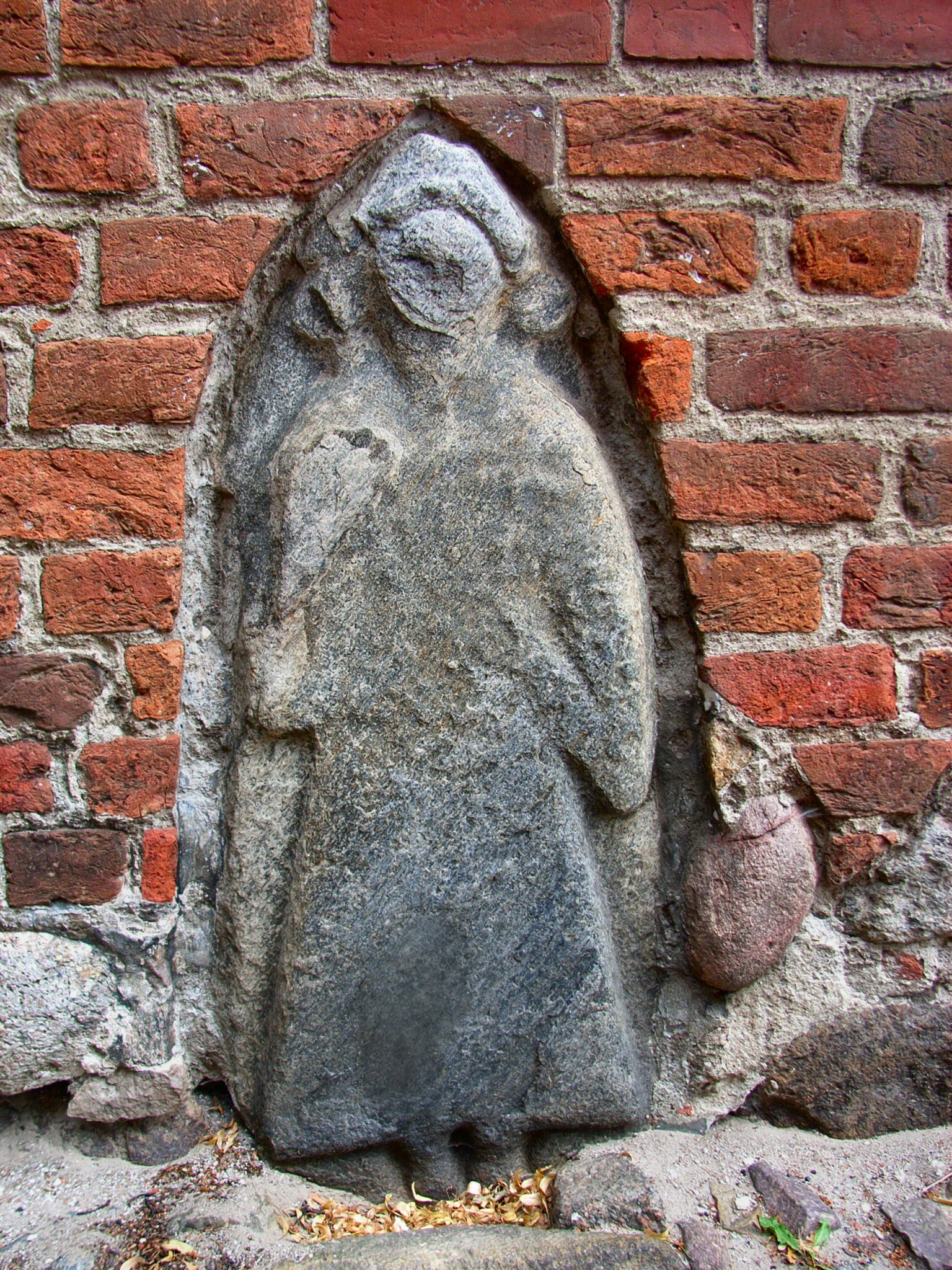
Relief in the west facade of St. Mary's Church

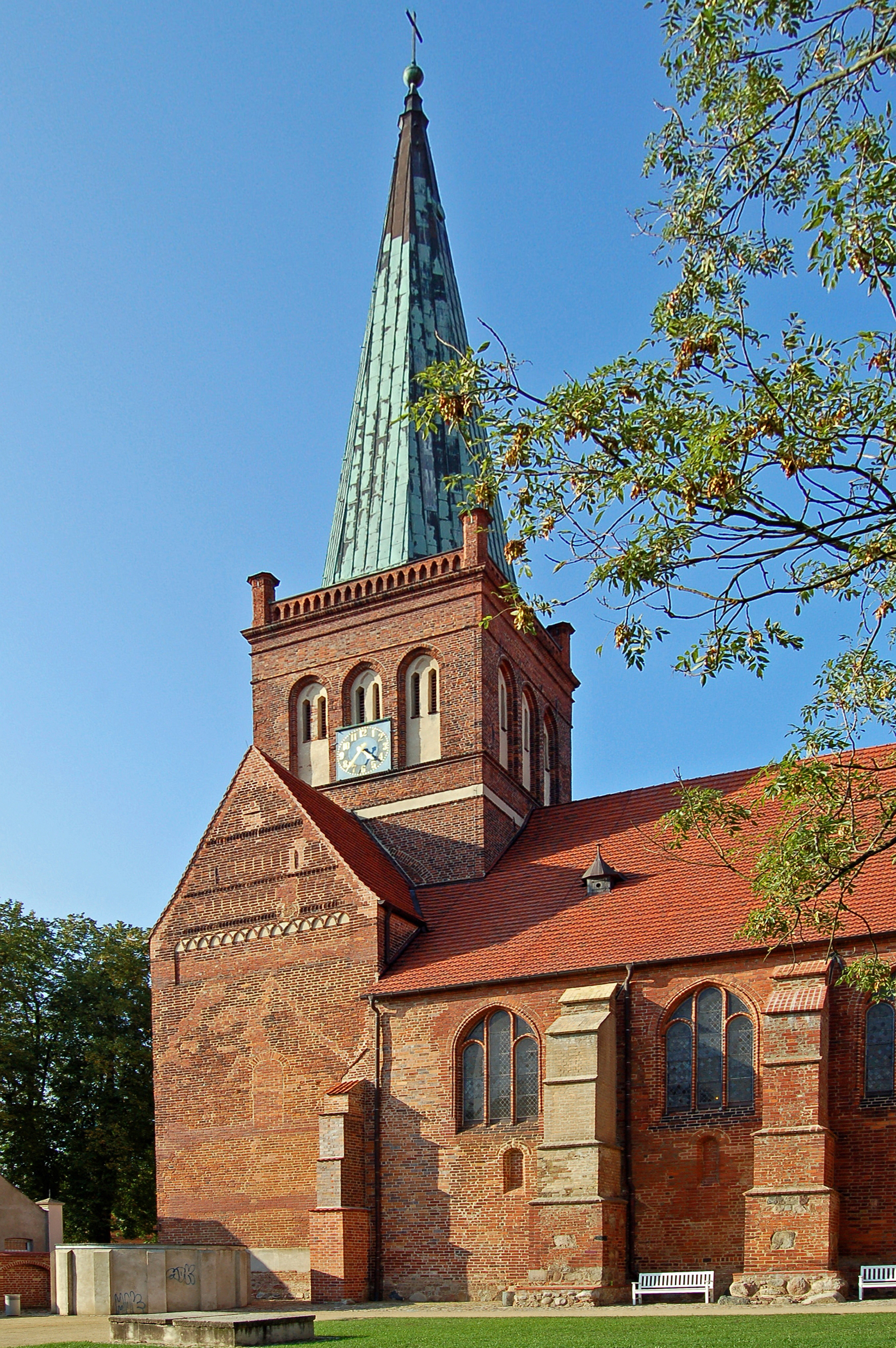
St. Mary's Church

=== Museums ===
The museum of the town of Bergen is located in one of the carefully restored buildings of the former abbey. The exhibition covers the following:

  - Ground floor: prehistory and early history of Rügen, from the Stone Age to the end of the Slavic period in 1168, when Christianity came to the island
  - Upstairs: Bergen's town history from the foundation of the abbey to the mid-19th century.

=== Buildings ===
- The former abbey church, St. Mary's, began in 1168 as a palace church for the Rügen prince, Jaromar I, and was completed before 1193, apart from the westwork. The triple-aisled basilica church is the oldest surviving brick building in Mecklenburg-Western Pomerania. The gravestone recessed into the outer wall of St. Mary's Church is believed to be that of the Prince. Another tombstone embedded in the church is the Tombstone of Elizabeth of Wolgast in Bergen. Of note is the Roman mural, the only example in northern Germany of the complete painting of a church. In the 14th century it was expanded into a hall church.
- St. Bonifatius, Bergen, seat of the Roman Catholic Church in Rügen.
- The monastery buildings of Bergen Abbey, founded in 1193, date to the 12th and 13th centuries. Some were knocked down in 1600 and after 1829, leaving only remnants of the refectory in the carriage house and two two-storey brick houses from 1732.
- Many town houses, mostly two-story timber framed buildings, for example those in Kirchplatz 13 with its brick facade.
- Many notable front doors, for example, Mühlenstraße 4
- Memorial stone at the "cemetery" entrance in Billrothstraße for twelve murdered prisoners at Stutthof concentration camp who, during the evacuation of the camp and their arrival in Lauterbach were shot by SS troops and buried in 1947 in Bergen.
- 1964 memorial on Rugardweg to anti-fascist resistance fighters
- Adjacent to the historic town centre is the woodland area of Rugard. From the Ernst Moritz Arndt tower, completed in 1877 and which stands at a height of 91 m above NN, there are extensive views over large parts of the island.
- A sommerrodelbahn opened on 25 June 2005 in the northern part of the Rugard.
- The Bergen Rotensee "socio-cultural community centre", with cinema club, open since February 2005. Readings, concerts and creative art exhibitions are at held here.

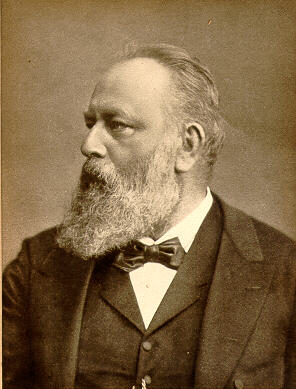
Theodor Billroth, 1887

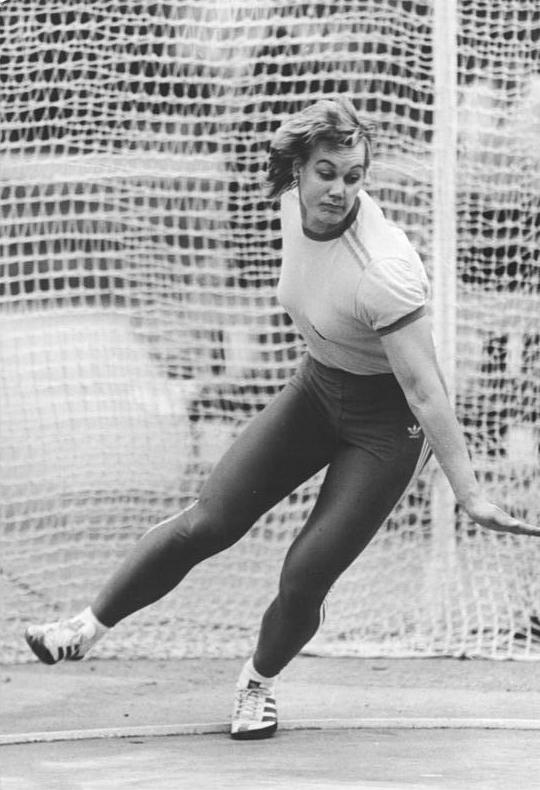
Diana Gansky, 1987

== Notable people from Bergen auf Rügen ==
- Arnold Ruge (1802–1880), writer.
- George Boldt (1851–1916), US entrepreneur, hotelier, and builder of Boldt Castle in New York State
- Theodor Billroth (1829–1894), doctor and surgeon and amateur pianist and violinist.
- Hans Delbrück (1848–1929), German historian and politician.
- Max Delbrück (1850–1919), an agricultural chemist.
- Karl Albrecht, (DE Wiki) (1859–1929), Protestant theologian, philologist and orientalist
- Gertrud Berger (1870–1949), painter of landscapes and still life associated with Greifswald.
- Hans Langsdorff (1894–1939), naval officer, commanded German cruiser Admiral Graf Spee
- Andreas Khol (born 1941), Austrian politician
- Holger Teschke, (DE Wiki) (born 1958), German writer
- Nils Jörn (born 1964), historian and archivist
- Devid Striesow (born 1973), actor
- Paul-Joachim Timm (born 1990), politician

=== Sport ===
- Diana Gansky (born 1963), discus thrower; silver medallist at the 1988 Summer Olympics
- Ines Pianka (born 1969), volleyball player, team captain, 1996 Summer Olympics
- Steffi Nerius (born 1972), javelin thrower; silver medallist at the 2004 Summer Olympics

== City partnerships ==
- Oldenburg in Holstein, Germany
- Svedala, Sweden
- Goleniów, Poland

== Gallery ==
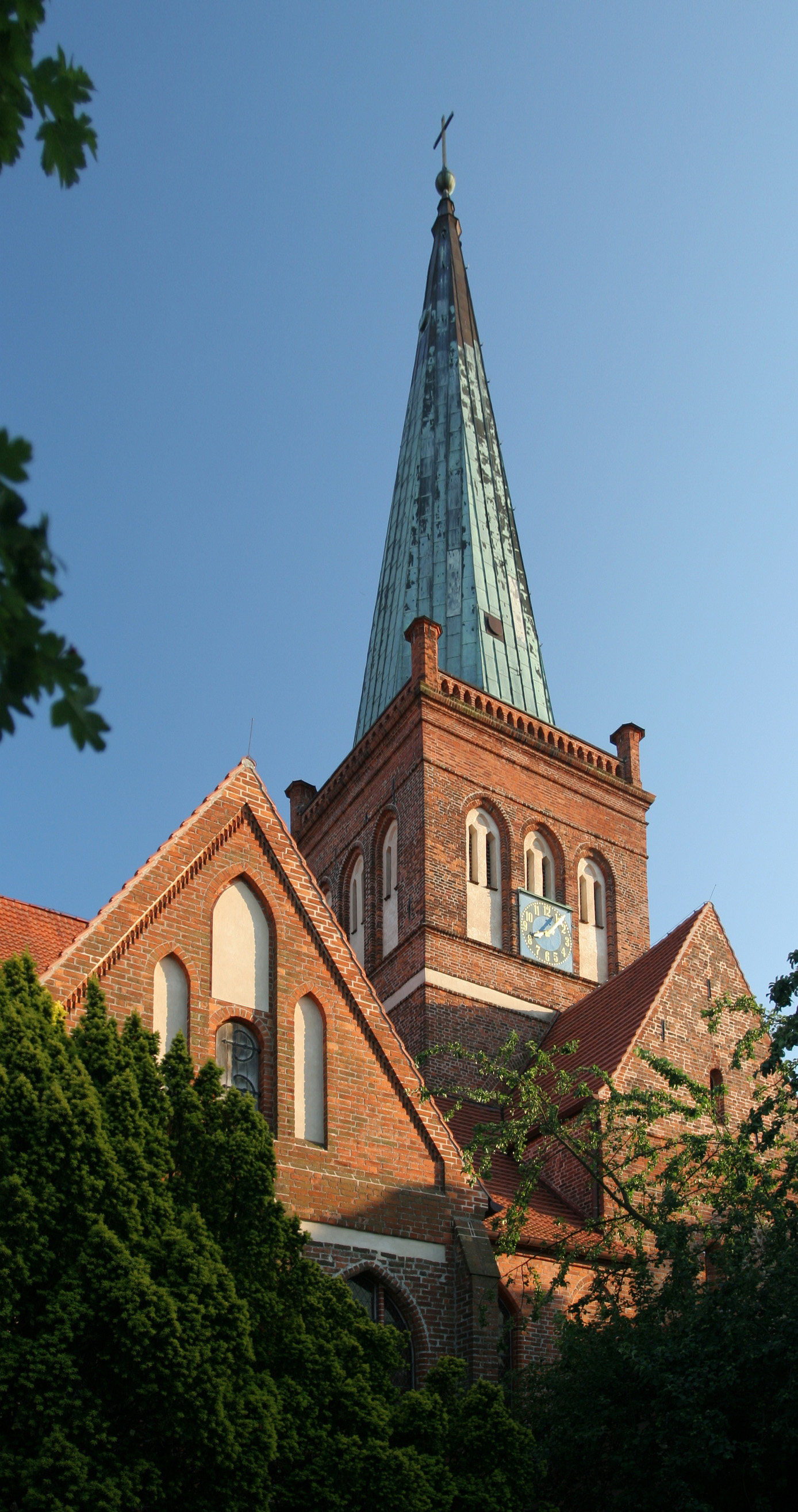
St. Mary's Church

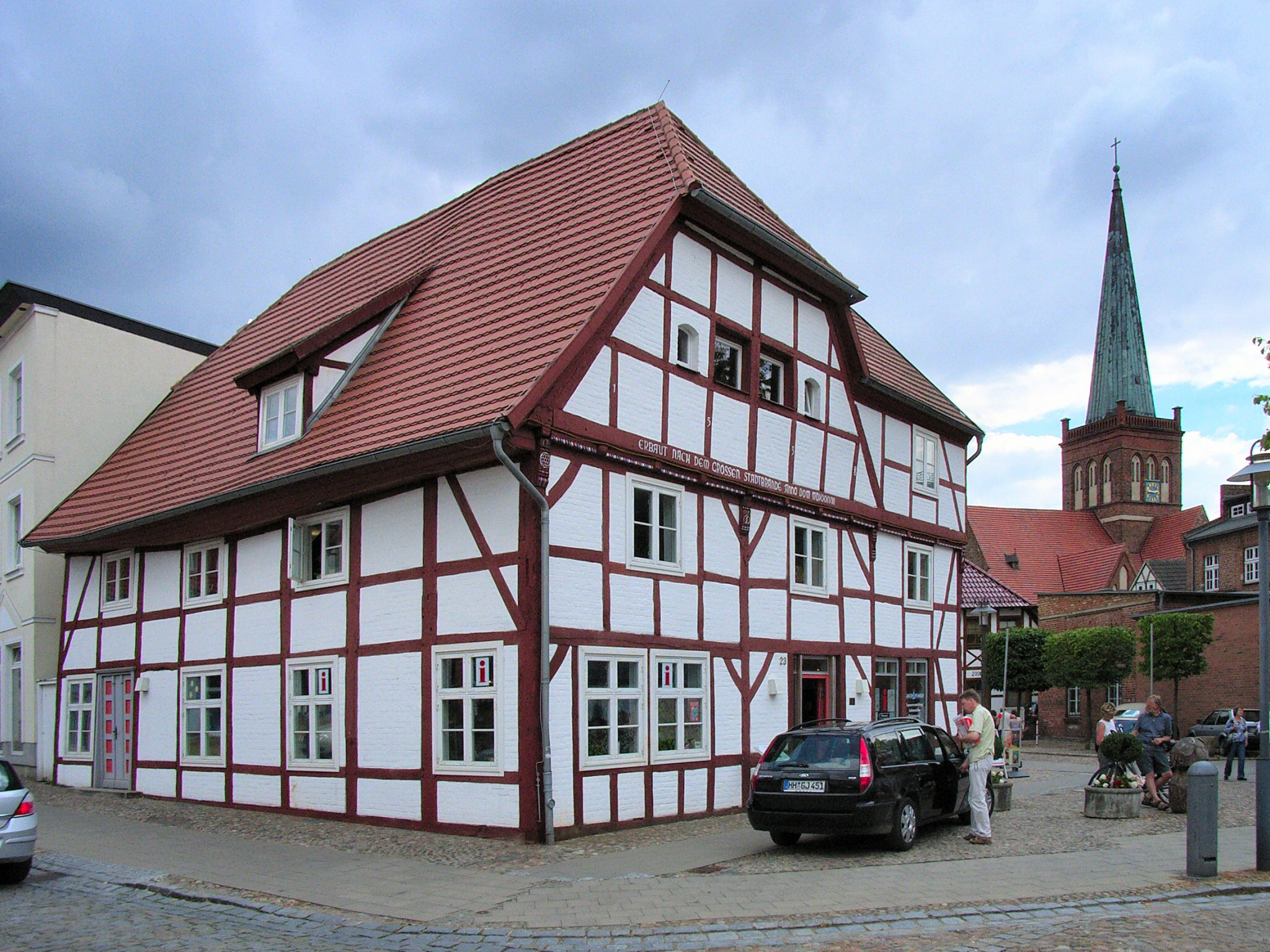
Timbered house at the market square

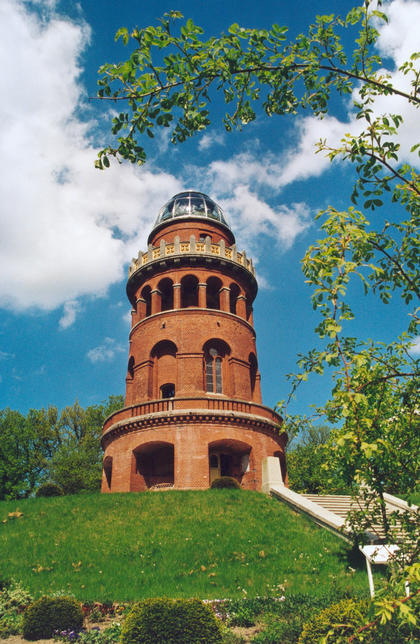
Rugard Tower

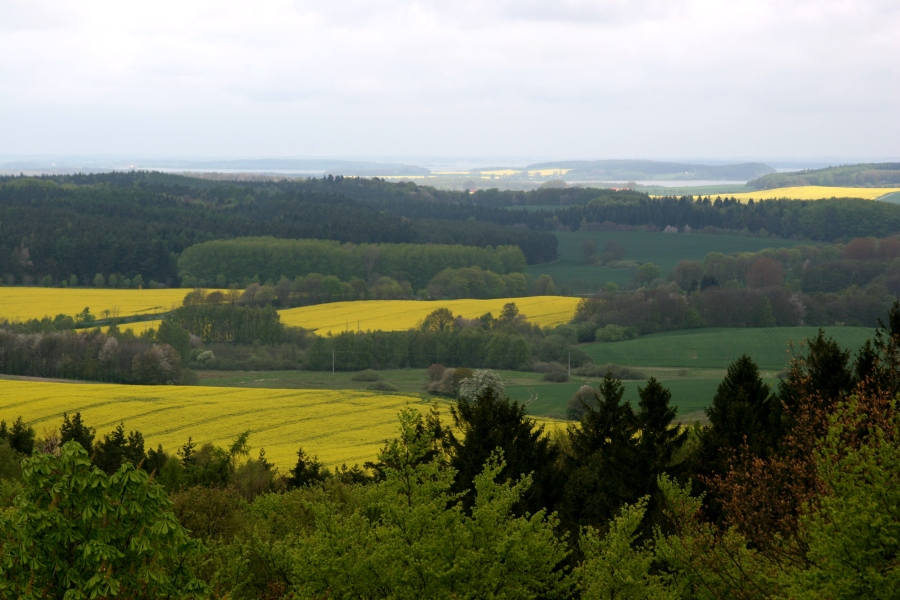
Panorama of shallow bays and the Baltic Sea (NE)

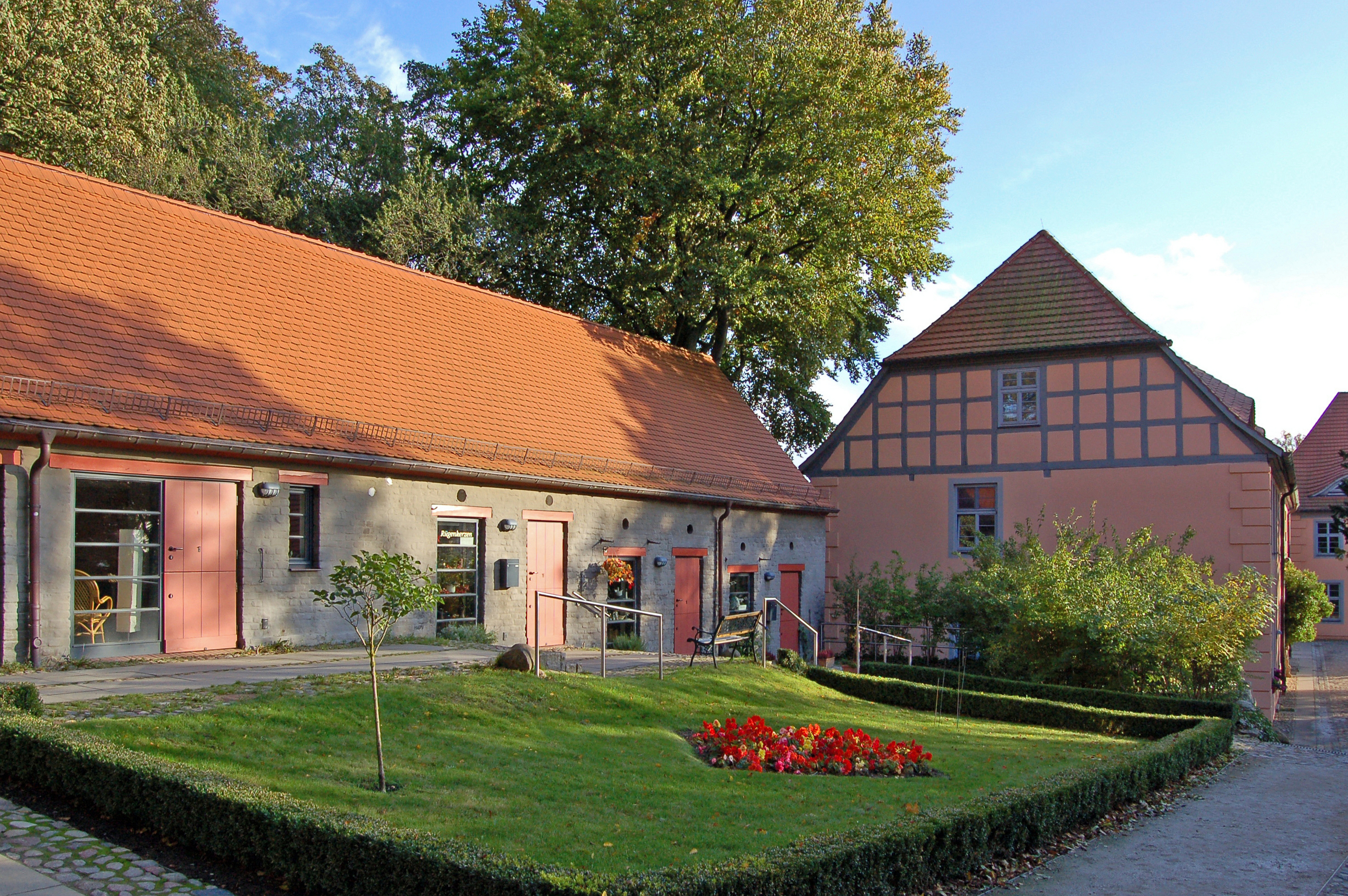
Monastery

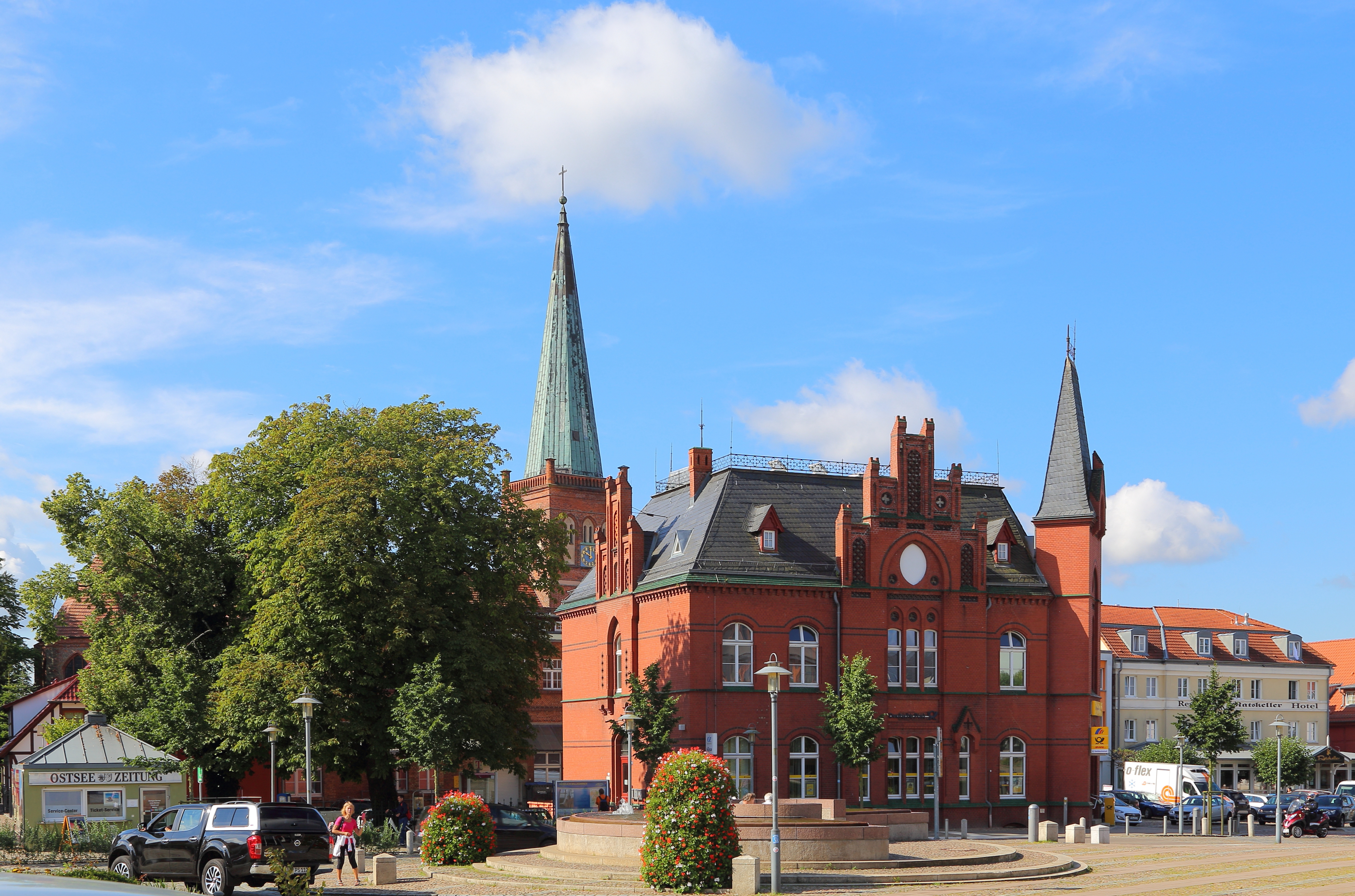
Market

== Sources ==
- Gustav Kratz: Die Städte der Provinz Pommern – Abriss ihrer Geschichte, zumeist nach Urkunden. Berlin 1965 (Nachdruck 1996 durch Sändig Reprint Verlag, Vaduz, ISBN 3-253-02734-1), pp. 39–42 (Volltext).
- Wolfgang Rudolph: Die Insel Rügen. Hinstorff Verlag, Rostock 1999, ISBN 3-356-00814-5.
- Sabine-Maria Weitzel: Die romanischen Wandmalereien im Chor und Querschiff der St.-Marien-Kirche in Bergen auf Rügen – Original und Erfindung. In: Baltische Studien. Pommersche Jahrbücher für Landesgeschichte. Neue Folge Band 91 (Band 137 Der Gesamtreihe) 2005, Kiel 2006, pp. 39–60.
- Gerold Schmidt: Der Kirchenmaler und Mosaikkünstler des Historismus Prof. August Oetken (1868–1951). In: Das Melanchthonhaus Bretten. Verlag Regionalkultur, Ubstadt-Weiher 1997, pp. 167–212.
