= Tombstone of Elizabeth of Wolgast in Bergen =

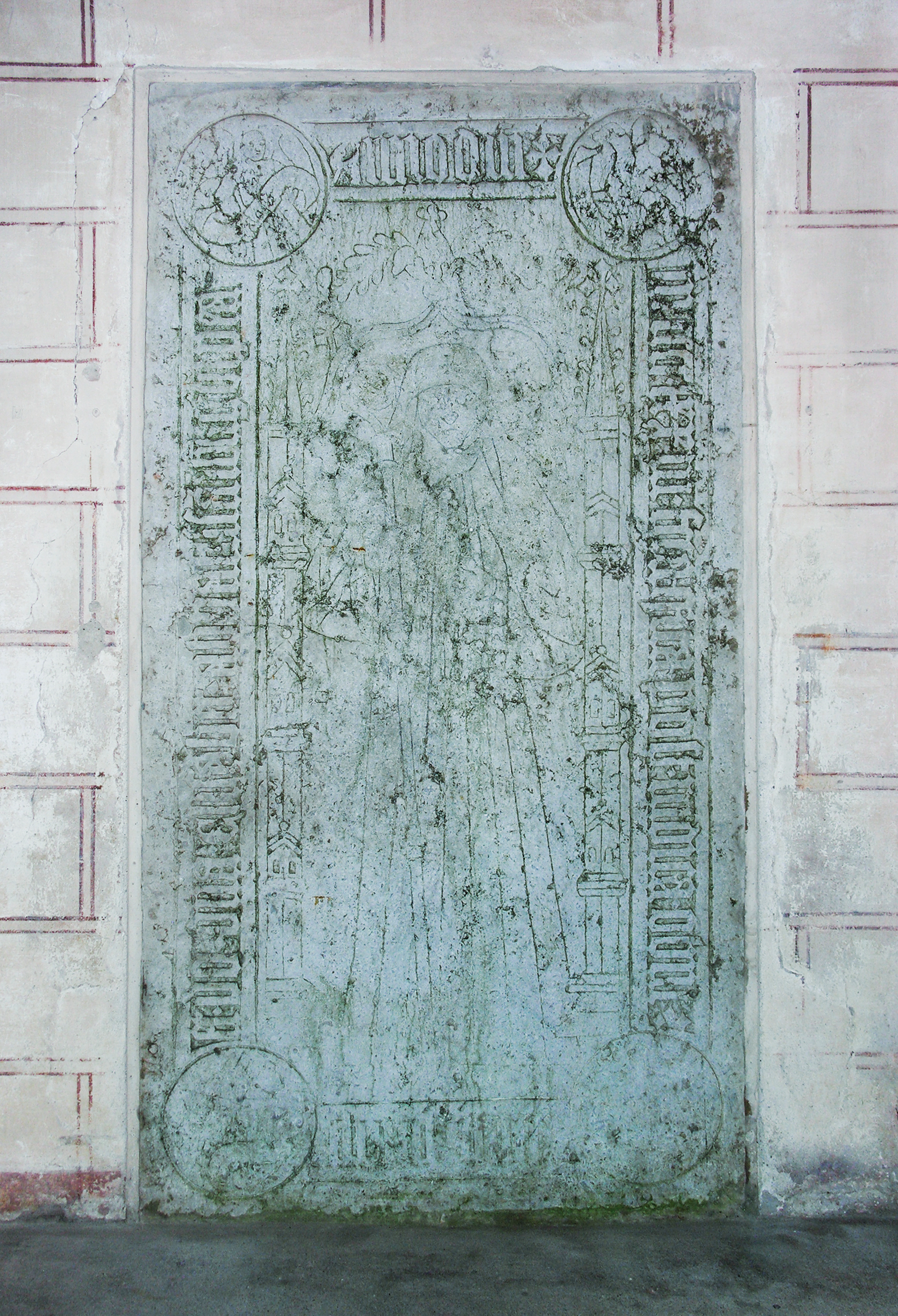
- Year: c. 1473
- Dimensions: 237 × 124 cm
- Location: St. Mary's Church; Bergen auf Rügen

The Tombstone of Elizabeth of Wolgast in Bergen is a well-preserved limestone tombstone, dating to around 1473, measuring 237 cm in height and 124 cm in width. It is embedded in the eastern wall of the western church porch of the former Cistercian St. Mary's Church in Bergen auf Rügen on the island of Rügen in Germany. The tombstone features an engraved image of Elizabeth, daughter of Duke of Wolgast Wartislaw IX of the House of Griffin, who served as abbess of the Cistercian convent from at least 5 January 1460 until her death on 7 April 1473. The inscription, framed by a band, reads: "Anno d(omi)ni / m cccc • lxxiii • fe(r)ia • q(ua)rta • post • iudica • obiit / Jllust(ri)s • p(ri)nceps / et • do(min)a • d(omi)na • Elisabet • abbatissa i(n) berg(en) ora p(ro) ea", translating to: "In the year of our Lord 1473, on the Wednesday after Judica Sunday, died the illustrious princess and lady, Lady Elizabeth, abbess in Bergen, pray for her".

== Description of the tombstone ==
The limestone tombstone of Abbess Elizabeth, dating to around 1473, was originally located in the chancel of the former Cistercian St. Mary's Church in Bergen auf Rügen on Rügen. In the 1890s, it was uncertain whether it marked her actual burial site, though this possibility was not ruled out. The tombstone was later moved, likely in 1896 or 1897, to the eastern wall of the western church porch, in its left section. Measuring 237 cm in height and 124 cm in width, the tombstone is well-preserved and follows a traditional design. It depicts the deceased abbess, daughter of Duke of Wolgast Wartislaw IX of the House of Griffin and Sophia, likely from the Saxon-Lauenburg dynasty, dressed in a habit under a canopy (lacking a floral motif above the left shoulder). She holds a crozier, symbolizing her abbess authority, in her right hand and a girdle book in her left. Due to the period and material, the depiction lacks individualized features, presenting a typical representation. Surrounding the figure is a 9.5 cm wide band inscribed with a Latin inscription in Gothic minuscule with corresponding majuscule letters, set between two stone moldings: "Anno d(omi)ni / m cccc • lxxiii • fe(r)ia • q(ua)rta • post • iudica • obiit / Jllust(ri)s • p(ri)nceps / et • do(min)a • d(omi)na • Elisabet • abbatissa i(n) berg(en) ora p(ro) ea", meaning "In the year of our Lord 1473, on the Wednesday after Judica Sunday, died the illustrious princess and lady, Lady Elizabeth, abbess in Bergen, pray for her". The inscription begins at the top left of the monument, with words separated by quadrangles. The corners of the depiction feature medallions with Evangelist symbols. The lower part of the inscription and depiction is partially worn.

== Characteristics of the inscription's script and reading issues ==
The inscription's long letters extend significantly beyond the central field. Notable features include the shape of majuscule A – pseudo-uncial with a thickened left diagonal line – and E, internally rounded with extended upper and lower serifs. The minuscule a varies graphically but is bipartite, r is reduced to an arc with a quadrangle above it, and x has a vertical left stroke. After the word d(omi)ni, a rhomboid cross is engraved. Following the word obiit in the second part of the inscription, three quadrangles appear. In do(min)a, the superscript a is represented by two quadrangles, as is the case in ora. The word pro is rendered as a special legal abbreviation (notae iuris). There is a possibility of reading q(ua)rta as q(u)i(n)ta, though this is less likely.

== Attempts at reading the inscription from the 18th to 20th centuries ==
In 1738, Johann David Fabarius interpreted the final part of the inscription as Bergensis oratorii Priorissa. Due to significant wear in the lower part of the tombstone, the segment Jllust(ri)s • p(ri)nceps was interpreted variously. Johann Jacob Grümbke's readings in his 1819 and 1833 publications (substituting the cross symbol with cruciati in the latter and incorrectly identifying the date of death as 8 April) rendered it as: i(n) monast(erio) p(ri)ncip(issa) et ducissa (despite reading do); he also interpreted the final part as orate pro ea. The same transcription was provided by Julius Bentley Løffler in his 1873 article on the Bergen church, reiterated in 1879 by its German translator, Gottlieb von Rosen. Alfred Haas accurately reproduced the inscription in his 1891 article and 1893 book, with the only differences being the transcription du(cissa) and an erroneous death date (8 April). In 1897, Martin Wehrmann reiterated this reading but correctly identified the death date as 7 April. Also in 1897, Ernst von Haselberg provided a new reading in his catalog of monuments in the Region of Stralsund. The first part of the inscription was rendered as Anno d(omi)ni †, and the lower part as i(n) m(o)n(a)s(terio) p(r)iori(ssa) et do(minarum), the latter being incorrect due to the dual terminology of priorissa and abbatissa. This publication also included the first drawing of the tombstone. In his unattributed 1898 article, Martin Wehrmann endorsed Haselberg's reading as more credible. The same reading was used in a popular album of Pomeranian monuments. In 1924, Hermann Hoogeweg, in the first volume of his book on Pomeranian ecclesiastical institutions, deemed the lower part of the inscription too illegible and considered Grümbke's and Haas' readings superior to Haselberg's, while uniquely interpreting the phrase et do(mina). In 1990, Maria Glińska mistakenly cited the first part of Haas' reading as pria grta instead of feia qrta.
