= Rage in Heaven =

1941 film by W. S. Van Dyke

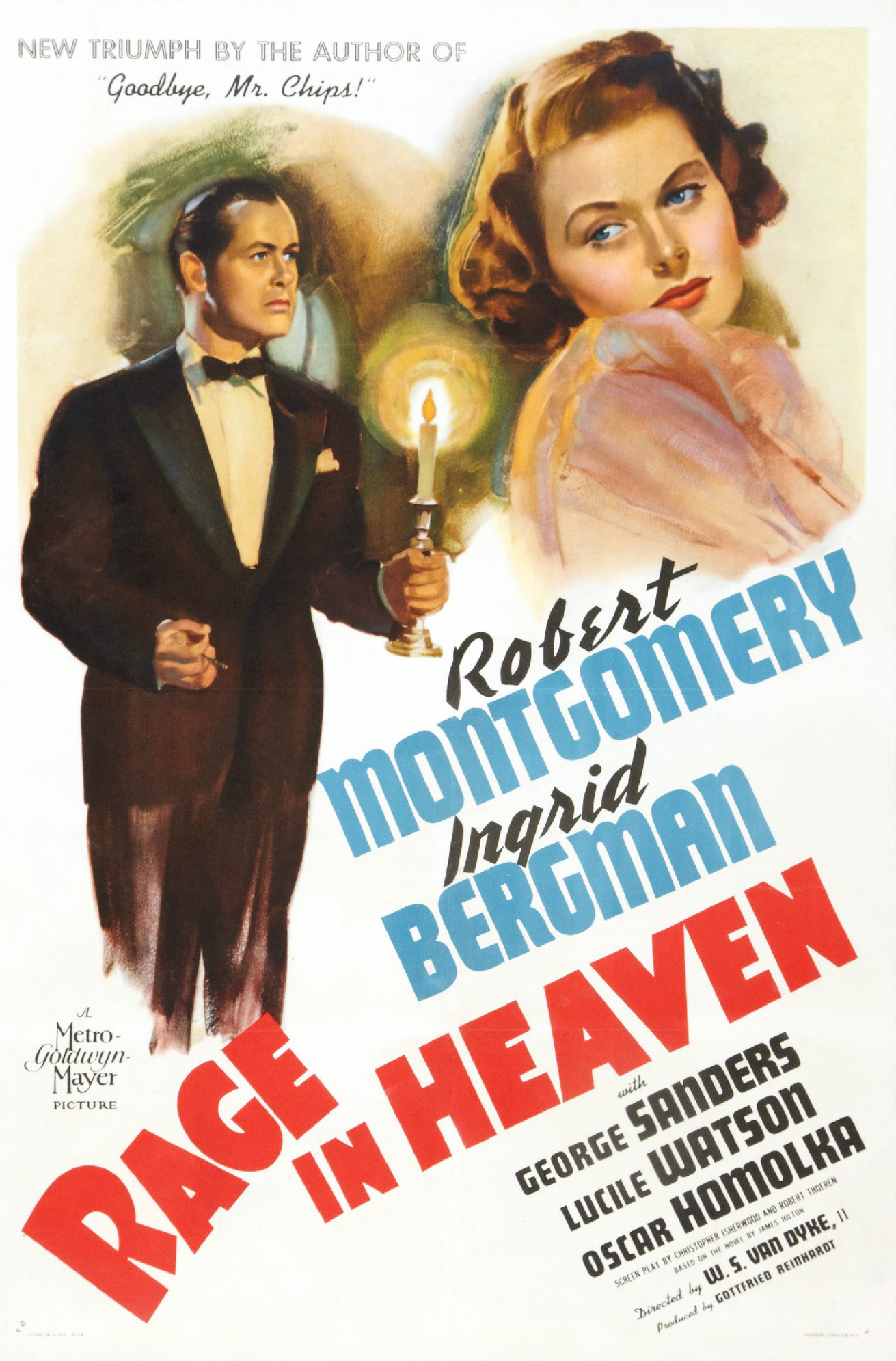
- Theatrical release poster
- Directed by: W.S. Van Dyke; Robert B. Sinclair; Richard Thorpe
- Screenplay by: Christopher Isherwood; Robert Thoeren
- Based on: Rage in Heaven; 1932 novel by James Hilton
- Produced by: Gottfried Reinhardt
- Starring: Robert Montgomery; Ingrid Bergman; George Sanders
- Cinematography: Oliver T. Marsh; George J. Folsey
- Edited by: Harold F. Kress
- Music by: Bronislau Kaper; Mario Castelnuovo-Tedesco; Eugene Zador
- Production company: Metro-Goldwyn-Mayer
- Distributed by: Loew's Inc.
- Release date: March 7, 1941 (United States)
- Running time: 85 minutes
- Country: United States
- Language: English

Rage in Heaven is a 1941 American psychological thriller film noir about the destructive power of jealousy. It was directed by W. S. Van Dyke and based on the 1932 novel by James Hilton. It features Robert Montgomery, Ingrid Bergman, and George Sanders.

== Plot ==
The film opens with the following quote: "Heaven hath no rage like love to hatred turned." which is incorrectly attributed to Milton; the quote is from William Congreve's The Mourning Bride.

At a mental institution in Paris, Doctor Rameau discusses with the British consul the case of a man who identifies himself as Ward Andrews. The doctor believes Andrews to be English and wants the consul's assistance in verifying this. Outwardly the man may seem sane, but underneath he suffers from paranoia, suicidal tendencies and is capable of murder. The doctor takes the consul to meet Andrews, but they discover he has escaped.

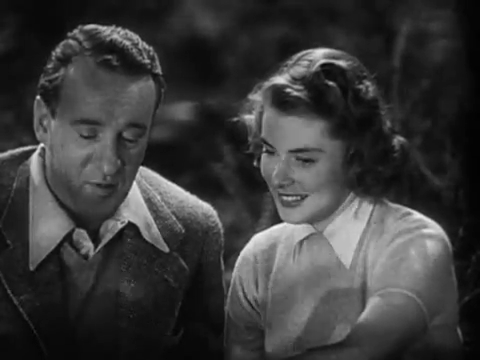
George Sanders and Ingrid Bergman

Phillip Monrell and his former college roommate Ward Andrews run into each other in London and Monrell invites his old friend back to his family home. When they arrive, they meet Stella Bergen, the secretary of Phillip's mother. Both men are strongly attracted to her. She is friendly with the more responsible, hardworking Ward but prefers and marries the idle Phillip instead. Ward leaves for a job in Scotland.

Phillip is put in charge of the family steel mill but is not suited to the position. He begins to exhibit signs of mental illness, in particular, abnormal suspicion that his wife and Ward are in love. Despite this jealousy, he invites Ward for a visit and hires him to be the chief engineer at the mill. Eventually, Phillip's paranoia drives him to try to kill his perceived rival at work. Ward confronts him, admits his love for Stella, quits the steel mill, and returns to London.

After a frightening moment with her husband, Stella leaves him and goes to Ward. Phillip promises to grant her a divorce if Ward will return to talk with him in person. Having prepared a plan designed to frame Ward, Phillip provokes a loud argument with him which he knows is being overheard by a servant.

Afterwards, Phillip kills himself, after ensuring that Ward will be arrested for murder. Ward is convicted and sentenced to be executed. The day before the execution, Stella is visited by Dr. Rameau. He has seen a photo of Phillip in a newspaper and informs her that her husband was a patient who masqueraded as Ward Andrews and escaped from the institution. He is convinced that Phillip committed suicide and that he would have left some message bragging about it. Phillip's mother reveals that her son kept diaries; then, Clark, the butler, remembers that he mailed a package to Paris the night Ward visited and Phillip died. Stella and Rameau take a flight to France and find the book, which exonerates Ward.

== Cast ==
- Robert Montgomery as Philip Monrell
- Ingrid Bergman as Stella Bergen
- George Sanders as Ward Andrews
- Lucile Watson as Mrs. Monrell
- Oskar Homolka as Dr. Rameau
- Philip Merivale as Mr. Higgins
- Matthew Boulton as Ramsbotham
- Aubrey Mather as Clark
- Frederick Worlock as Solicitor-General
- Francis Compton as Bardsley
- Gilbert Emery as Mr. Black
- Ludwig Hardt as Durand (credited as Ludwig Hart)

== Reception ==
When the film opened, in March 1941, New York Times critic Bosley Crowther looked to a wartorn world and observed: “At a time when the world is already sufficiently concerned with paranoiacs, Metro has oddly seen fit to create yet another—and a thoroughly unsympathetic one.... True, the depredations of this wholly fictitious marplot are comfortably confined to the screen—and that is a blessing, at least. But why he should ever have been invented, why he should have been so clumsily conceived and why Robert Montgomery should have been chosen to play him is hard to understand. Certainly, the picture itself fails to offer any adequate justification.... Ingrid Bergman plays with a warm and sincere intensity which is deeply affecting.... But Mr. Montgomery in the focal role is inclined toward a deadpan deliberateness which grows monotonous... he never really suggests a mental crack-up. He is just a fellow with a mean disposition—a pointlessly diabolic wretch. It has been reported from Hollywood that Mr. Montgomery was compelled to play this role as "discipline" for some things he said in public about motion pictures. That may be an explanation for the general obtuseness of the film, but it seems like a desperate device. There is such a thing, you know, as cutting off one's nose to spite's one's face. And, in turning out Rage in Heaven, Metro hasn't done itself any good.”

Describing Rage in Heaven as “one of MGM’s stock-in-trade grandiose jobs,” film critic Manny Farber, in The New Republic, November 26, 1946, offers this appraisal of Bergman’s performance:

Miss Bergman is completely unaffected… without any of the polish and over-ambitious acting of her work in Notorious (1946) and Spellbound (1945). With sparkling loveliness, she projects so pure an air of enchanted, yearning innocence that she seems out of place in this picture among so many artful old hands.

Writing in 2011, film critic Dennis Schwartz was disappointed with the film and wrote about the problems on the set: "MGM forced Montgomery to make this pic under threat of suspending him and cutting his studio salary. ... Montgomery wanted time off the seven-year contract for a vacation. To get even with the studio Montgomery decided to just read his lines in a deadpan manner and not act. This ruse didn't help a pic that needed all the help it could get, as the plot was far-fetched and the melodramatics were stilted."

== Sources ==
- Farber, Manny. 2009. Farber on Film: The Complete Film Writings of Manny Farber. Edited by Robert Polito. Library of America. ISBN 978-1-59853-050-6
