= Gertrud Berger =

German painter

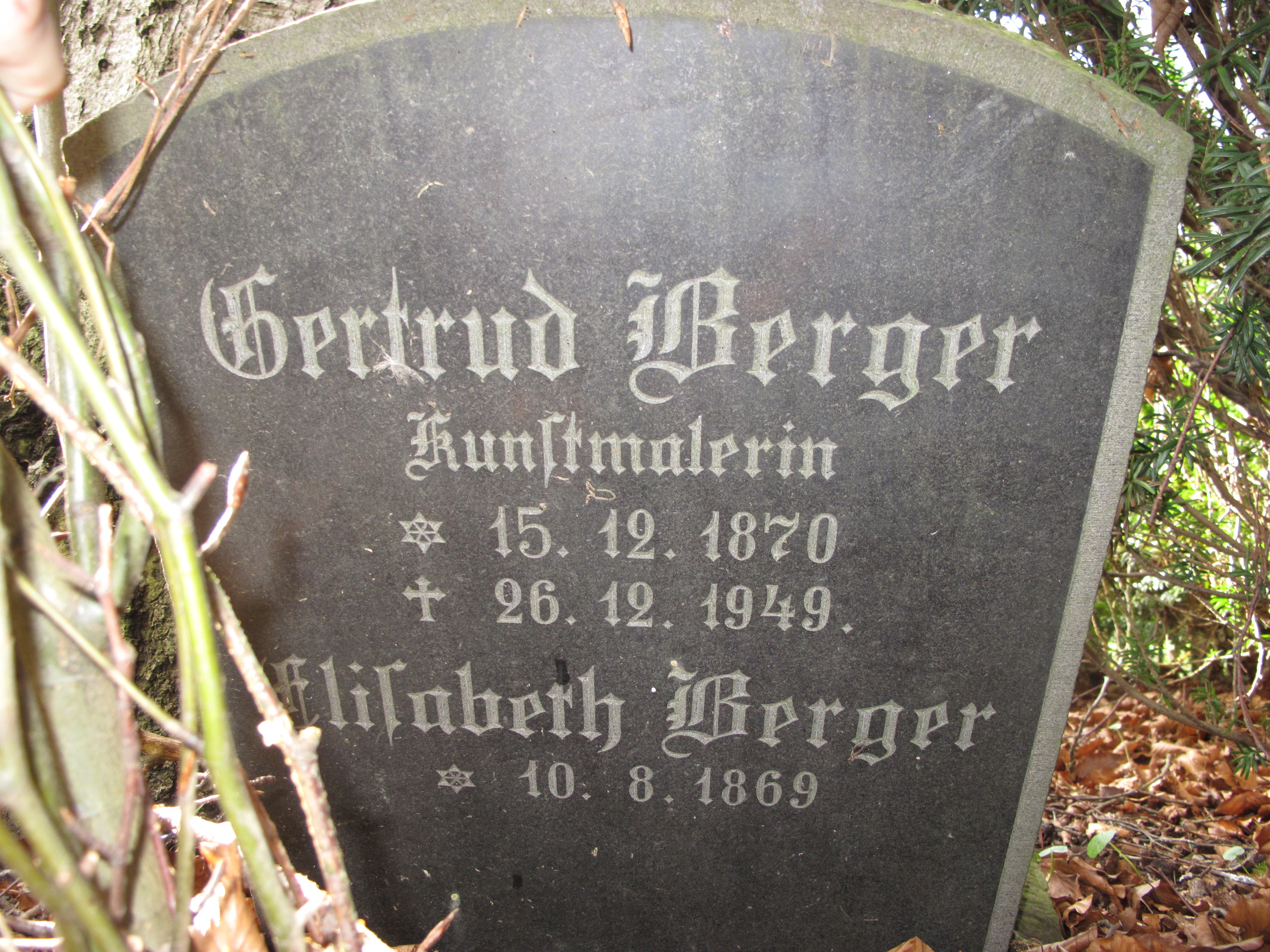
- her grave
- Born: 15 December 1870; Bergen auf Rügen, Kingdom of Prussia
- Died: 26 December 1949 (aged 79); Greifswald, Mecklenburg-Vorpommern, East Germany
- Known for: painter of landscapes and still life

Gertrud Berger (15 December 1870 – 26 December 1949) was a German painter of landscapes and still life associated with the town of Greifswald.

== Life ==
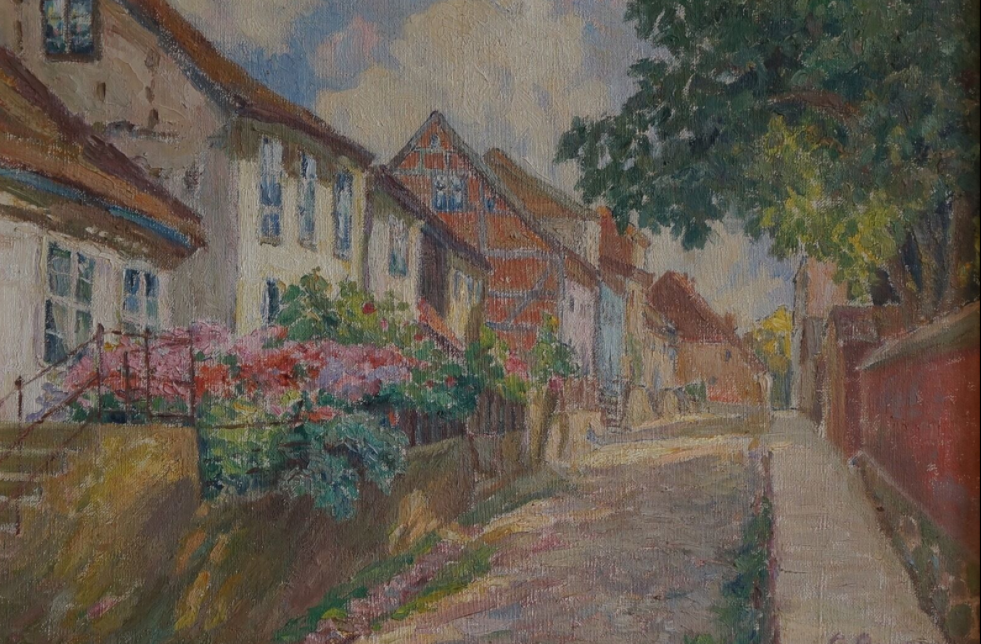
Streetview in Greifswald

Berger was born in 1870 in Bergen auf Rügen. She was the second child of Marie Wilhelmine Friederike Tiburtius and her husband Carl Wilhelm Ferdinand Berger, a lawyer and notary. She was baptized on 1 February 1871 at her home by the deacon of the St Mary's Church (Bergen), Bublitz.

Berger studied in Berlin where she was a student of Max Uth, L. Meyer, and Ernst Kolbe (1876–1945). Her subjects were landscapes and still lifes. Afterwards she lived and worked in Greifswald.

Berger died in Greifswald in 1949, and her tombstone is in the Greifswald New Cemetery.

== Works ==
- Portrait of a Child
- On the coast
- Dorfstrasse in Wieck near Greifswald
- Sailing ship in front of pine-covered cliffs
- Domstrasse in Greifswald
- North German landscape with windmill and goatherd
- Sailing ship off Usedom
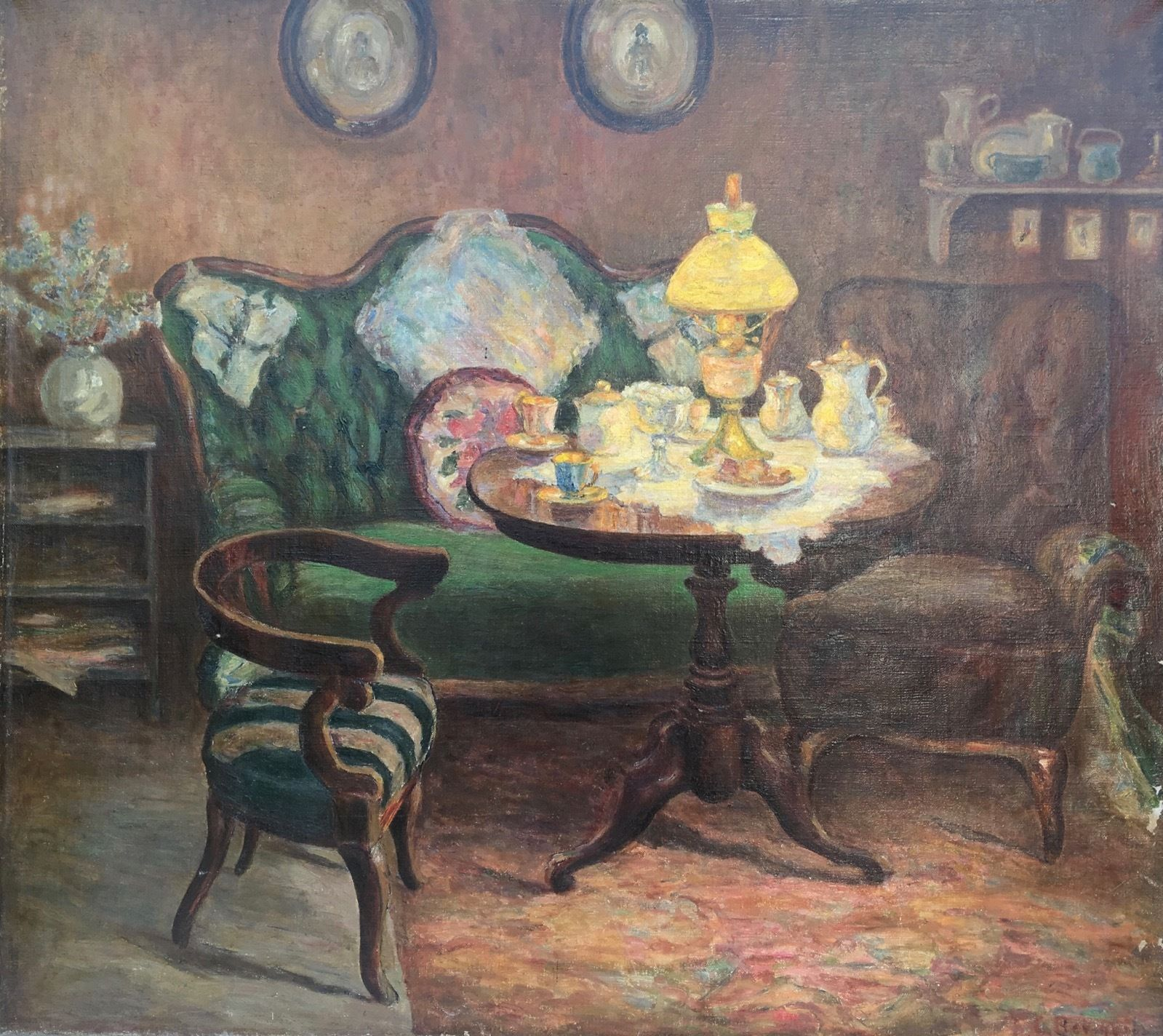
  Kaffeetisch
