= Ekensund Artists' Colony =

Art colony in Jutland, Denmark

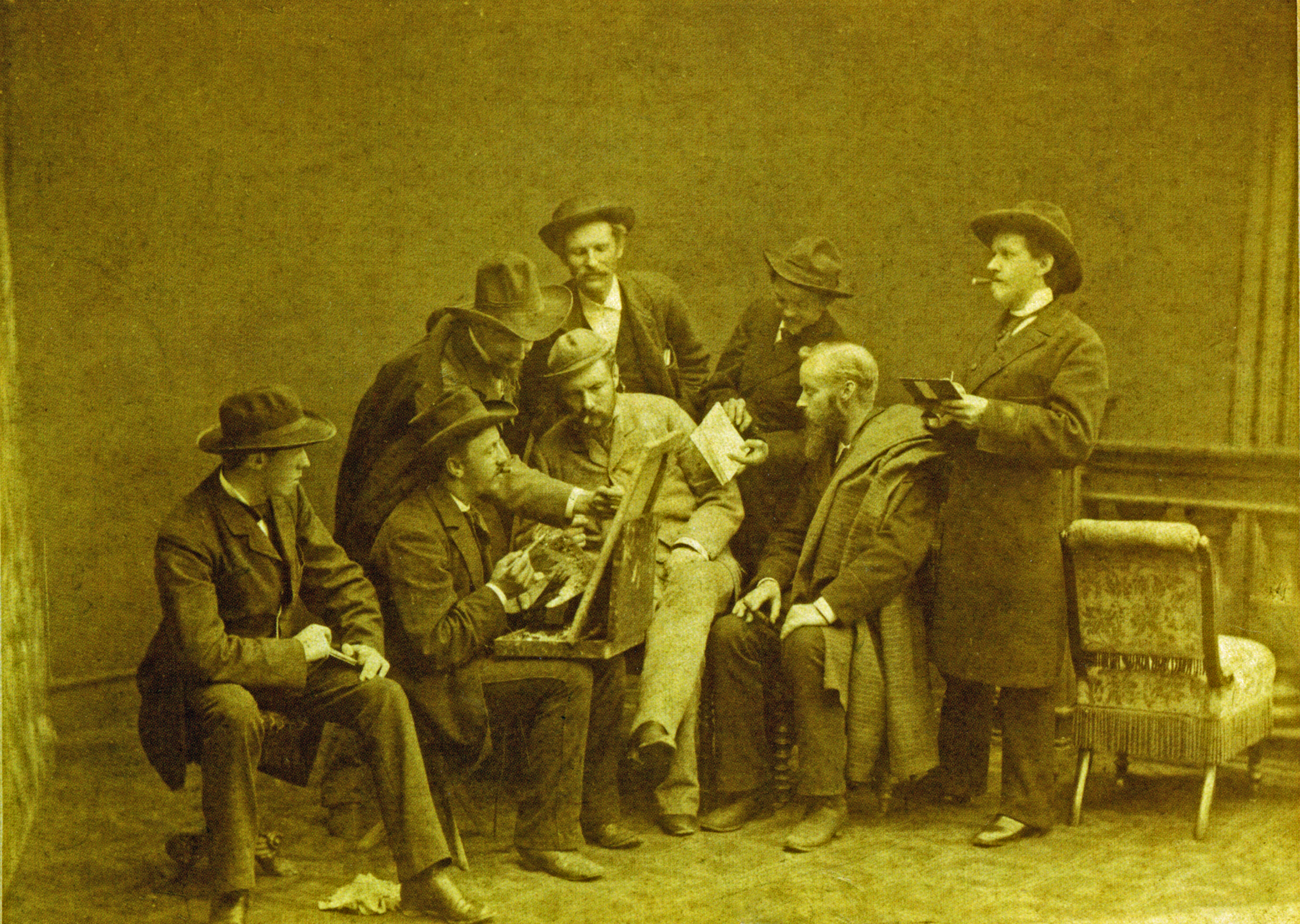
Die Ekensunder Künstlerkolonie, photo by Wilhelm Dreesen, 1882

The Ekensund Artists' Colony (German - Künstlerkolonie Ekensund) was a late 19th-century art colony in Egernsund Sogn, now in southern Jutland on the north bank of the Flensburg Firth in Denmark, but then known as Ekensund and part of the Province of Schleswig-Holstein within the German Empire. It drew artists including Wilhelm Dreesen, Alexander Eckener, Otto Heinrich Engel, Emmy Gotzmann, Johannes Knutz, Erich Kubierschky, Jacob Nöbbe, Heinrich Petersen-Angeln, Johann Sander and Fritz Stoltenberg.

== Bibliography ==
- Ulrich Schulte-Wülwer (2001), Künstlerkolonie Ekensund am Nordufer der Flensburger Förde (in German) (2nd ed.), Heide: Boyens & Co., ISBN 978-3-8042-0867-4
- Ferdinand Ruigrok van de Werve (2015), Farbige Kraft in schwierigen Zeiten – Emmy Gotzmann. Eine Malerin der Berliner Secession 1881-1950 (in German), Kiel: Dr. Steve Ludwig, ISBN 978-3-86935-256-5
- Ekensund im Kreis der Künstlerkolonien an der Ostsee. Ausstellungskatalog Gemäldegalerie Dachau. Dachau 2016, ISBN 978-3-930941-87-2.
