= Dreesen =

Dreesen is a surname. Notable people with the surname include:

- Bill Dreesen (1904–1971), American baseball player
- Jan-Christian Dreesen (born 1967), German football administrator
- Liesbet Dreesen (born 1976), Belgian swimmer
- Tim Dreesen (born 1987), Belgian footballer
- Tom Dreesen (born 1939), American stand-up comedian
- Wilhelm Dreesen (1840–1926), German-Danish photographer
- Willi Dreesen (1928–2013), Swiss painter and sculptor
