= Ernst Moritz Arndt Tower =

Monument in Rügen, Germany

Coordinates: 54°25′18″N 13°26′41″E

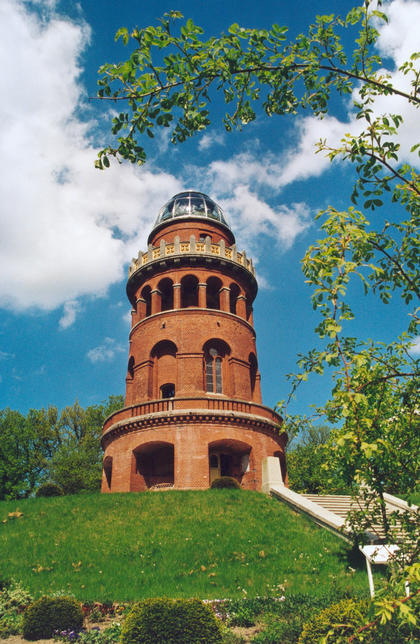
The Ernst Moritz Arndt Tower

The Ernst Moritz Arndt Tower (German: Ernst-Moritz-Arndt-Turm) stands on the top of the Rugard, the highest point of the central region of the German Baltic Sea island of Rügen. It is listed as a historic structure by the county of Rügen.

== Origin and construction ==
In preparation for the 100th anniversary of the German poet, Ernst Moritz Arndt, an Arndt Monument Committee was formed in 1869 under the chairmanship of Rügen Landrat, von Platen, and the Bergen mayor, Dr. Richter. Donations were asked for and architects invited to submit designs. The foundation stone was laid on 26 December 1869, the day of the celebrations. The design chosen was by the master builder of the royal parliament, Hermann Eggert from Berlin, who ran the project from beginning to end. In summer 1872 the 13 foot high rock foundation of the tower was built and in the following winter the earthworks began. In 1873 the first storey was completed. At that point, the money ran out. Not until 1875 was the second storey and internal staircase built. In 1876 the third storey and the dome followed, so that on 6 October that year the topping out ceremony (Richtfest) was celebrated. In 1877 the 26.7 metre-high monument was finally completed.

== Literature ==
- Erich Anmack: Zum 50jährigen Bestehen des E. M. Arndt-Denkmals auf dem Rugard. In: Unser Pommerland Vol. 2 1928, p. 54.
