= Emmy Gotzmann =

German painter

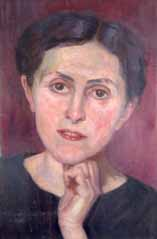
- Portrait by Eva Kusch
- Born: 19 March 1881; Frankfurt am Main, Germany
- Died: 27 September 1950 (aged 69)
- Occupation: Painter
- Known for: Ekensund Artists' Colony
- Spouses: Walter Conrad, Ludwig Hardt

Emmy Auguste Elisabeth Gotzmann (19 March 1881 – 27 September 1950) was a painter from Germany and a member of the Ekensund Artists' Colony.

== Biography ==
Emmy Gotzmann was born in Frankfurt am Main in 1881. She was the daughter of Klara, née Kammer, and Theodor Gotzmann, a director of the Reichsbank. She was educated at the Krahmersche girls' school. In 1901 she studied in Berlin with Max Uth at his school for women painters and at the Association of Berlin Artists where she was taught by Hans Baluschek and Martin Brandenburg. In 1901 and 1902 she went on study trips to Teterow and then to Penzlin, both in Mecklenburg-Vorpommern. The following year she went to Ekensund.

From 1903 to 1909 she was a member of the Ekensund Artists' Colony. She worked with Otto Heinrich Engel who had been in the area since 1896. She painted watercolours. She was his friend and she appeared in his paintings. She was also a model for a bust by the sculptor Heinz Weddig (1870-1946) who lived in Flensburg, and she lodged at his house from 1905.

In 1908 Gotzmann was given a solo exhibition at the Flensburg Museum of decorative arts. The reviews of the work commented on the strong colours and painterly works and noting that the paintings were bold and masculine.

Gotzmann was a long term member of the Association of Berlin Artists and from 1928 to 1930 she chaired the top committee. She first exhibited with them in 1906 and then on about a dozen occasions with the final entry in 1942. She is seen in the tradition of Van Gogh and the pointillists.

== Private life ==
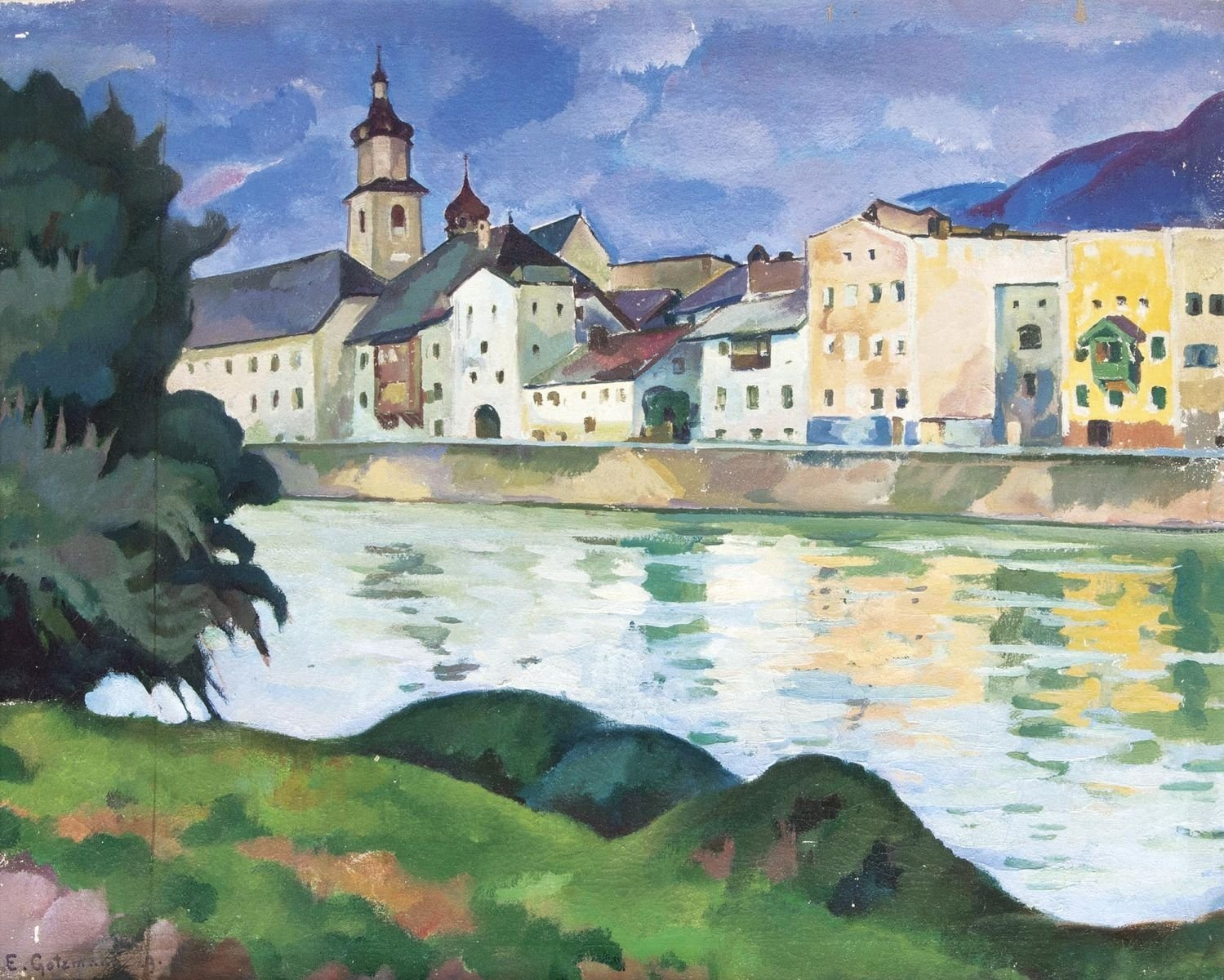
Rattenberg on River Inn, 1929, Gotzmann

Gotzmann was first married, in 1905, to the lawyer Walter Conrad and this marriage lasted until 1913 when she married the actor Ludwig Hardt.

== Selected exhibitions ==
- 1902/1903: Berlin Secession for the Drawing Arts
- 1908: Flensburg Museum of Applied Arts (today Museumsberg Flensburg)
- 1909: Schleswig-Holstein Art Association
- 1909: Kunsthalle Kiel
- 1910: Munich Glass Palace
- 1912: German Association of Artists
- 1912: Kunsthalle Bremen
- 1912: XXIV. Berlin Secession
- 1919: Anniversary exhibition of the Schleswig-Holstein Art Cooperative
- 1928: Kunstgewerbemuseum Berlin
