= Ludwig Hardt =

German actor (1886–1947)

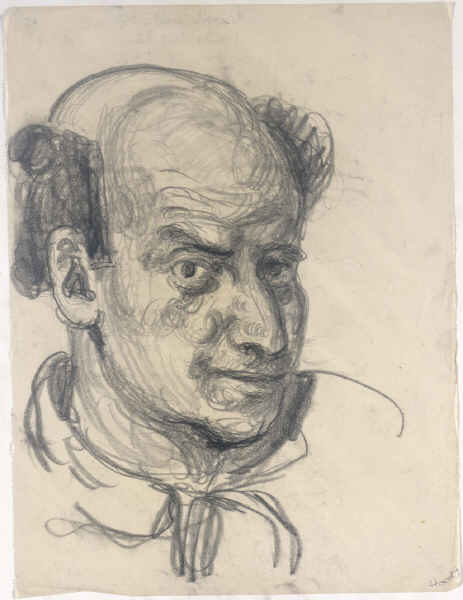
- Portrait of Ludwig Hardt
- Born: 16 January 1886; Neustadt O.S.
- Died: 6 March 1947 (aged 61); New York City
- Spouse: Emmy Gotzmann

Ludwig Hardt (16 January 1886 – 6 March 1947) was a German actor.

== Private life ==
In 1913 he became the second husband of the painter Emmy Gotzmann.

== Filmography ==
Year	Title	Role	Notes
1940	Dr. Ehrlich's Magic Bullet	Court Clerk	Uncredited
1940	Arizona	Meyer	
1941	Rage in Heaven	Durand	
1941	Underground	Tobacco Clerk	Uncredited
1942	Kings Row	Porter	Uncredited
1942	Desperate Journey	Pharmacist	Uncredited
1943	The Purple V	Old Peasant	Uncredited
1943	The Moon Is Down	Elderly Man	Uncredited
1944	The Conspirators	Refugee	Uncredited, (final film role)
