= Alexander Eckener =

German painter and graphic artist

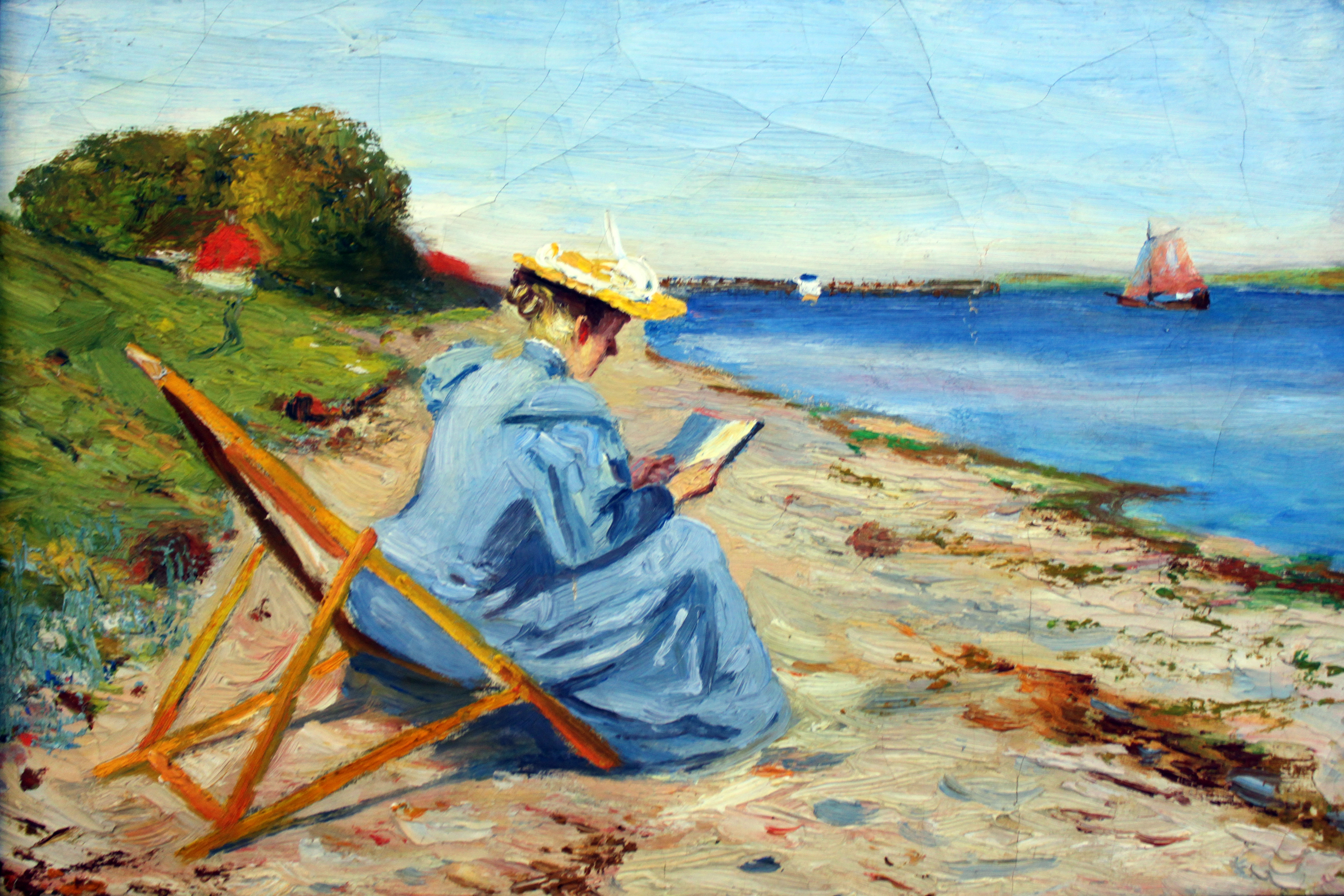
Toni Eckener on the Beach Near Rinkenæs

Alexander Eckener (21 August 1870, Flensburg – 26 May 1944, Aalen) was a German painter and graphic artist.

== Biography ==
His father, Johann Christoph Eckener (1824–1880) was a cigar manufacturer, and his mother, Anna Maria Elisabeth Lange (1832–1893), was the daughter of a shoemaker. He was their youngest child. His older brother, Hugo Eckener, commanded the airship Graf Zeppelin on its first flight around the world.

He received his initial artistic training and inspiration from Jacob Nöbbe, a local artist in Flensburg. With his support, Eckener was able to study at the Academy of Fine Arts, Munich, from 1888 to 1892. After graduating, he returned to his home town and became part of the Ekensund Artists' Colony.

In 1899, he went to Stuttgart and was accepted by the State Academy of Fine Arts. There, he was a master student of Leopold Graf von Kalckreuth, who introduced him to the art of etching; another genre in which he became proficient.

After 1908, he taught at that Academy himself and was named a Professor in 1912. He took on the position of Professor of lithography and woodcuts in 1925. He resigned that position in 1928, but continued to teach at the Academy until his retirement in 1936.

The Eckener-Schule RBZ (regional vocational training center) in Flensburg is named after him and his brother, Hugo.

== Sources ==
- Heinrich Rummel: Alex Eckener. Ein Malerleben zwischen Flensburg und Stuttgart. 2nd ed., Nord-Verlag, Flensburg 1975, ISBN 978-3-88042-289-6
- Brief biography @ the RBZ Eckener-Schule Flensburg
