= Wilhelm Dreesen =

German-Danish photographer (1840–1926)

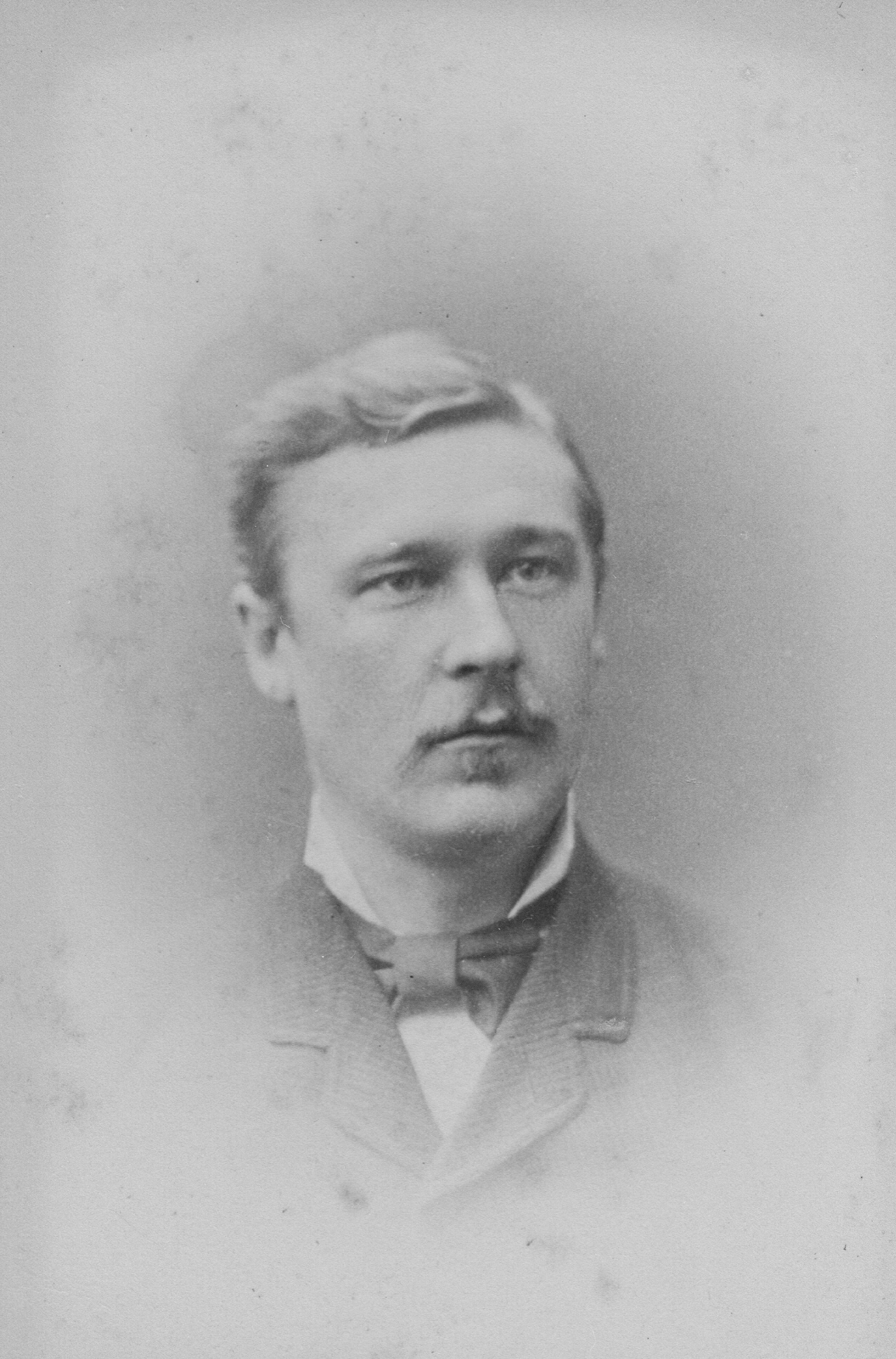
Self portrait, 1869

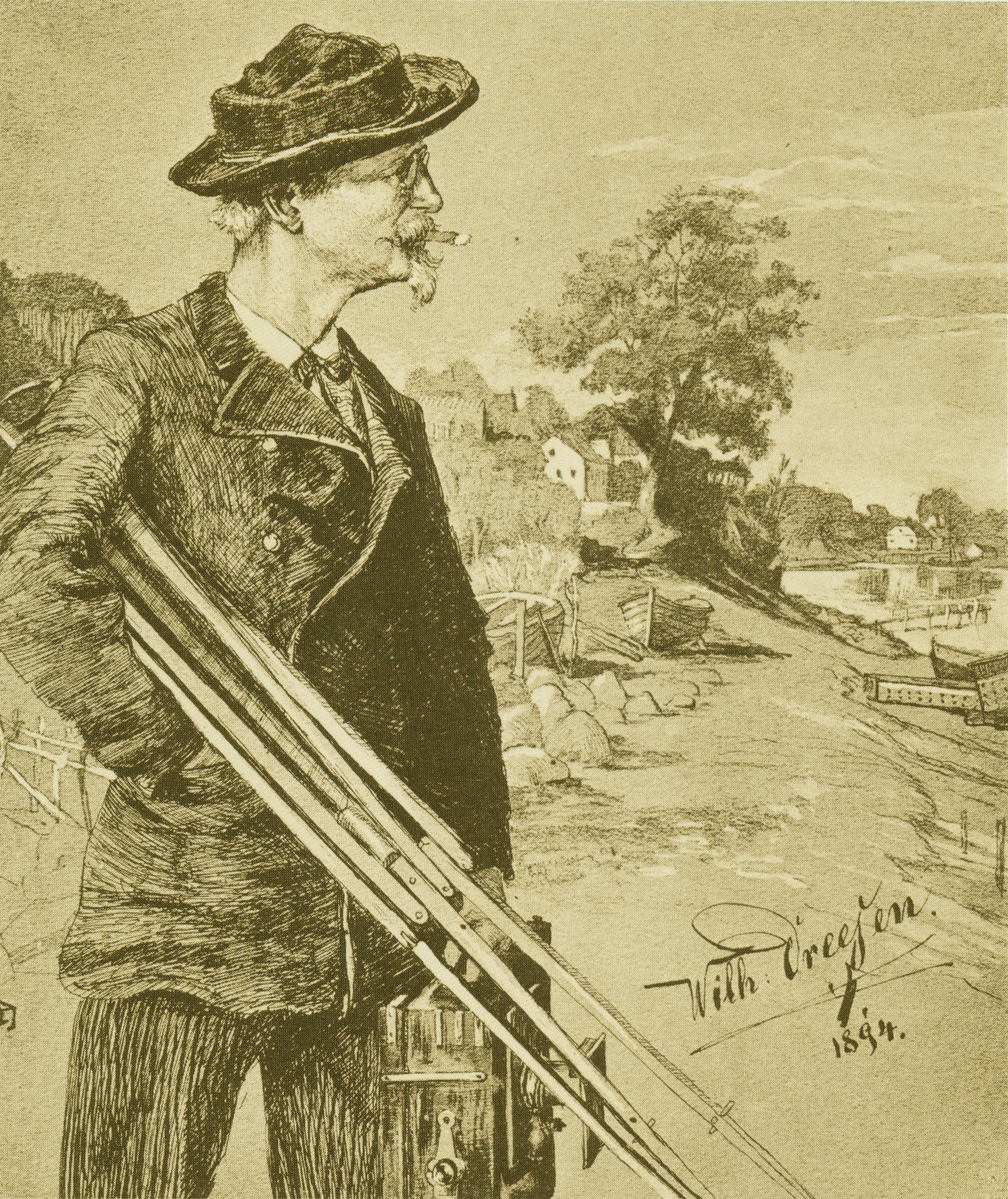
Self portrait, 1894

Wilhelm Anton Georg Dreesen (31 March 1840, Rendsburg – 18 December 1926, Flensburg) was a German-Danish photographer. He was involved with the Künstlerkolonie Ekensund. Many of his works were lost in the bombing of Hamburg during World War II.

== Bibliography ==
- Jürgen Jensen (1982), Schleswig-Holstein zur Kaiserzeit. Stadt und Land um 1900 auf Fotos von Wilhelm Dreesen (in German), Neumünster: Karl Wachholtz, ISBN 3-529-02669-7.
- Jürgen Jensen: Die Entdeckung von Heide und Moor um die Jahrhundertwende. Land und Leute zwischen Elbe und Aller, Weser und Jeetze auf Fotos von Wilhelm Dreesen. Karl Wachholtz Verlag, Neumünster 1984, ISBN 3-529-02679-7.
- Wilhelm Dreesen: Ulrich Schulte-Wülwer, Künstlerkolonie Ekensund, Heide 2000, S. 93–99.
