= Sophie Wencke-Meinken =

German painter (1874–1963)

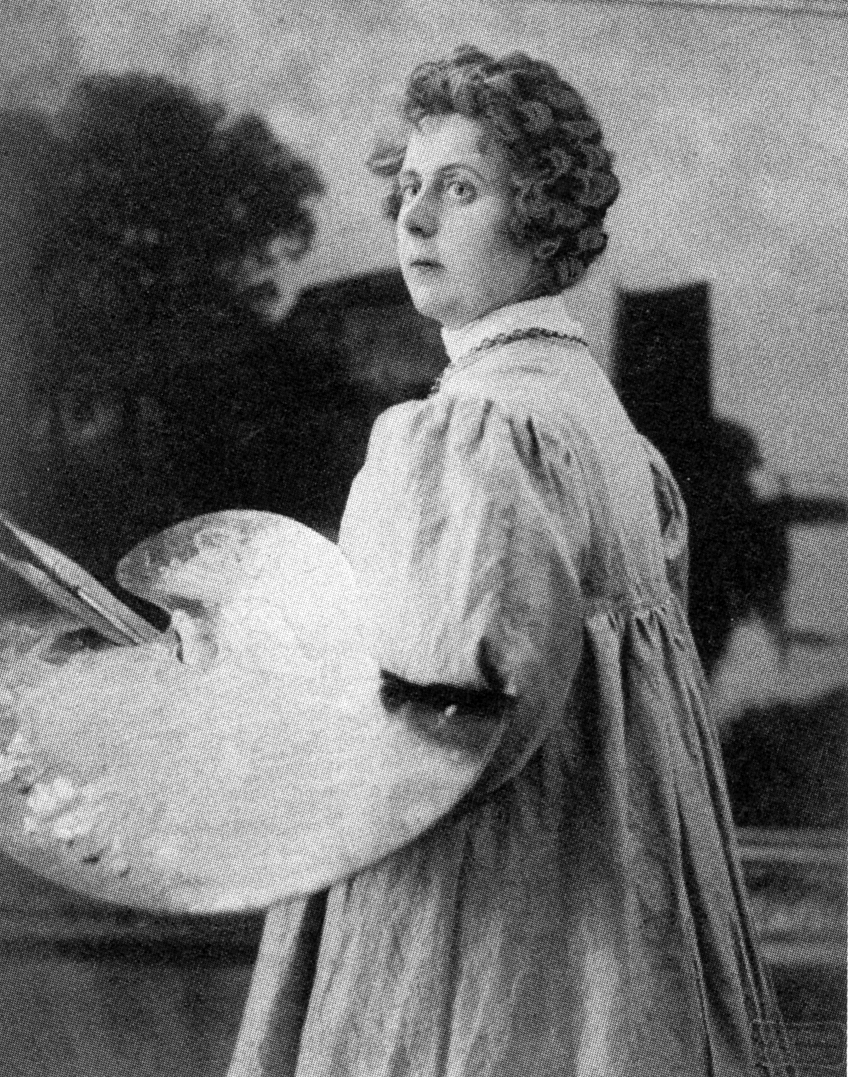
Sophie Wencke in 1898

Sophie Wencke-Meinken (29 July 1874 in Bremerhaven – 23 June 1963 in Worpswede) was a German painter.

== Biography ==
Sophie Wencke was the first child of Johanna Sophie and shipyard owner Nicolaus Diedrich Wencke (b. 1848) and granddaughter of shipyard entrepreneurs Gesine Wencke and her husband Friedrich Wilhelm Wencke. In 1884 she christened the first German trawler Sagitta for the Friedrich Busse shipping company. She attended school in Bremerhaven and studied art painting in Dresden from 1891 to 1893 and in Berlin from 1893 to 1897 with painters such as the animal painter Hermann Pansee, the landscape painter Berta Schrader and in Berlin with the landscape painter Max Uth. In 1898 she took part in the launching of the passenger steamer Assyria in Bremerhavenpart. In the same year, one of her best-known paintings was launched with the launch, which is now in the collection of the Bremerhaven Historical Museum (Morgenstern Museum).

From October 1898 she lived in Worpswede. In 1903 her younger sister Clara followed her. First she was a student of Otto Modersohn and she painted landscapes. From 1903 she also created templates for postcards and art prints for the art publisher Seemann in Leipzig. Through a lively exhibition activity with well-known painters such as Fritz Overbeck, Otto Modersohn and Heinrich Vogeler, among others in Bremen, Berlin, Leipzig, and Cologne, she became known primarily as a landscape painter in the Impressionist painting style. In 1910 she and her sister Clara moved into their own studio, which is now the Café Central.

From 1916 the two sisters stayed in the porcelain town of Selb and created templates for the Hutschenreuther porcelain factory. After the First World War (1919) she married the Hamburg Post Director Dr. Wilhelm Meinken, now calling himself Wencke-Meinken, lived in Hamburg-Bergedorf, but kept her studio in Worpswede.

From 1933 she lived in Worpswede again and created watercolors and then oil paintings for a Weser cycle. She fulfilled an order for the city of Remscheid. City views of Essen were created in the Third Reich. In 1941 and 1942 she was represented with two pictures at the Great German Art Exhibition in Munich, which was representative of the state-desired art in National Socialism and was propagated as the most important cultural event in National Socialist Germany. In 1941 her oil painting "Abendclouden" was shown, and in 1942 an inked chalk drawing titled "Worpsweder Landscape".

Study trips took Wencke to Italy, Scotland, and the Sauerland, among other places. She kept in touch with her home town of Bremerhaven and with the shipowners and shipyards and was artistically inspired.

== Works (selection) ==
- Launching, oil painting, 1898, Historical Museum Bremerhaven
- Bursfelde Monastery
- Houses in Teufelsmoor
- Hamme lowlands, oil/canvas, Lilienthal Art Foundation
- Bouquet of flowers in the window, oil/canvas, Lilienthal Art Foundation
- Weser cycle, oil paintings, 1933/34

== Literature ==
- Anja Benscheidt, Alfred Kube: The landscape painter Sophie Wencke. From the Wencke shipyard in Bremerhaven to Worpswede. Bremerhaven Historical Museum, Small Writings 8, Wirtschaftsverlag NW, Bremerhaven 2008, ISBN 978-3-86509-832-0
- Anja Benscheidt: Wencke, Sophie. In: Women's history(s), Bremen Women's Museum (ed.). Edition Falkenberg, Bremen 2016, ISBN 978-3-95494-095-0
- Herbert Black Forest : The Large Bremen Lexicon . 2nd, updated, revised and expanded edition. Edition Temmen, Bremen 2003, ISBN 3-86108-693-X
- Worpswede in all its variety. Weser Courier, 2011.
