= Hermann Eggert =

German architect (1844–1920)

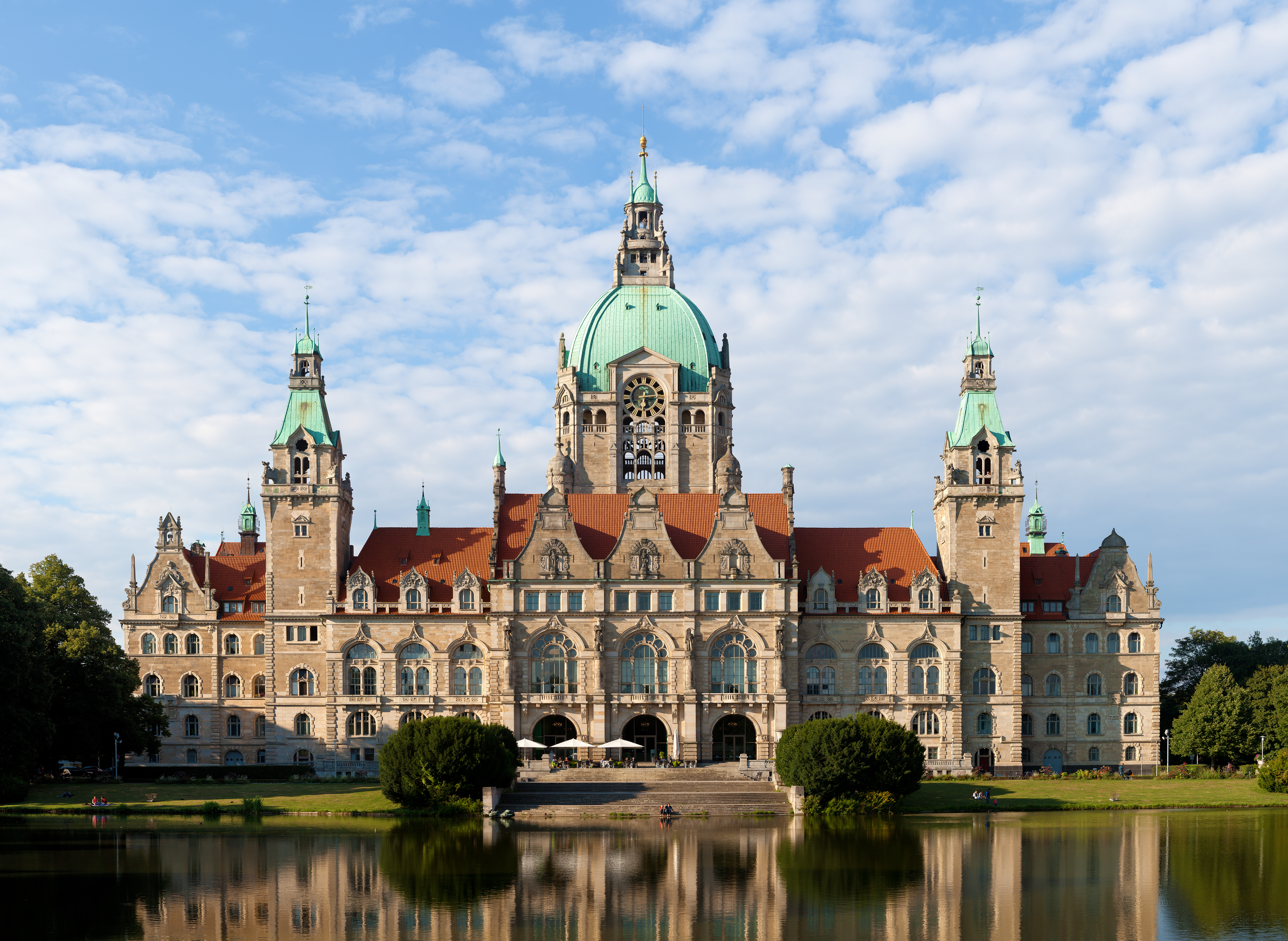
- Neues Rathaus Hannover, designed by Eggert
- Born: Georg Peter Hermann Eggert; 3 January 1844; Burg bei Magdeburg, Province of Saxony
- Died: 12 March 1920 (aged 76); Weimar
- Education: Bauakademie Berlin
- Occupation: Architect
- Awards: Prussian Academy of Arts

Georg Peter Hermann Eggert (3 January 1844 – 12 March 1920) was a German architect. He designed important public buildings such as the Frankfurt Main Station and the New Town Hall in Hannover, often in the style of Neo-Renaissance.

== Career ==
Born in Burg bei Magdeburg, Eggert studied with Heinrich Strack at the Bauakademie in Berlin. He worked from 1875 to 1889 as Universitätsbaumeister in Strasbourg, designing several buildings of the university in the Neustadt such as the observatory, and building the Palais du Rhin (Emperor's Palace) for Wilhelm II. He built the Frankfurt Main Station from 1883 to 1888, regarded as his most important building.

Eggert served as Oberbaurat in the Ministerium für öffentliche Arbeiten (Ministry of Public Works) of Prussia in Berlin, where he was mostly responsible for church buildings. He participated in the competition for the New Town Hall in Hannover in 1895, won the second competition a year later and was commissioned to build the exterior. From 1898 he worked in his own office in Hannover. He was in conflict about the design of the Prunkräume (Representative Rooms) of the Town Hall with Christian Heinrich Tramm who had designed the Welfenschloss (Welf palace, now the main building of Leibniz University Hannover), As a result, his contract was cancelled in 1909.

Many of Eggert's designs are in the style of Neo-Renaissance. He was a member of the Prussian Academy of Arts from 1896 in the section Bildende Künste (Arts). Eggert died in Weimar.

== Recognition ==
Many of Eggert's designs are held at the Museum of Architecture of Technische Universität Berlin. In the central Frankfurt Gallus quarter a section of a street called after Camberg was renamed Hermann-Eggert-Straße in 2009.

== Selected works and designs ==
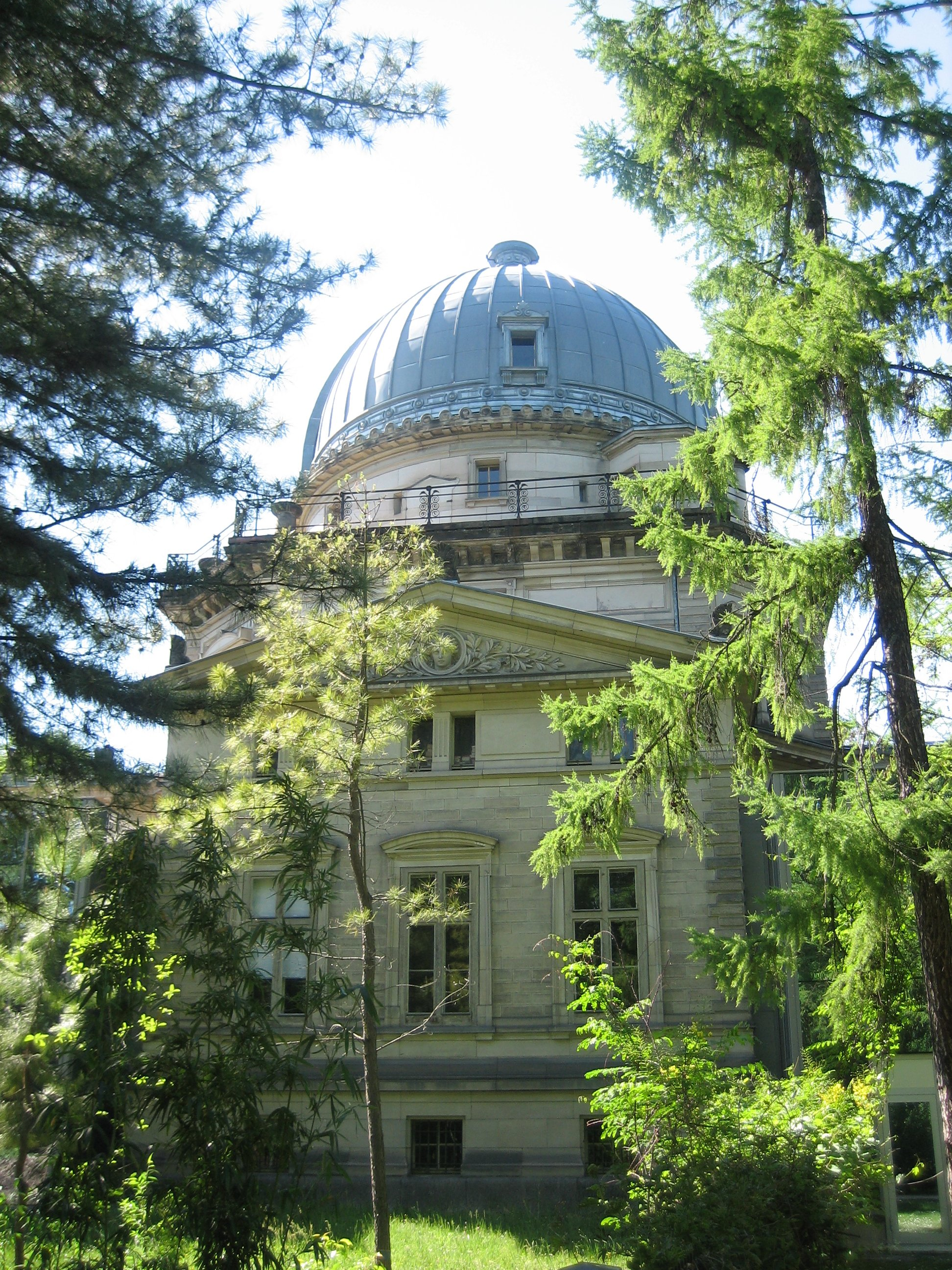
Sternwarte (Observatory) of the Strasbourg University

- 1869: Competition design for the new Berlin Cathedral (not built)
- 1872–1877: Ernst Moritz Arndt Tower on Rügen
- 1881: Observatory of the Strasbourg University
- 1883–1888: Frankfurt Main Station
- 1884–1889: Palais du Rhin in Strasbourg
- 1898: Hamburg-Altona station (demolished in 1978)
- 1898–1899: Tierärztliche Hochschule (Academy of Veterinary Medicine) in Hannover (destroyed in World War II)
- 1898–1909: New Town Hall in Hannover
- 1899–1902: Annex of the Technische Hochschule in Charlottenburg (now Technische Universität Berlin) (now Straße des 17. Juni 145)
- 1907: Bismarckturm in Burg bei Magdeburg

== Literature ==
- Spemanns goldenes Buch vom eigenen Heim 1905, No 493.
- Alexander Dorner: 100 Jahre Bauen in Hannover. Zur Jahrhundertfeier der Technischen Hochschule. Hannover 1931, p. 26.
- Christine Kranz-Michaelis: Das Rathaus im Kaiserreich. Kunstpolitische Aspekte einer Bauaufgabe des 19. Jahrhunderts. Kunst, Kultur und Politik im deutschen Kaiserreich}, vol. 4.) Gebr. Mann, Berlin 1982, ISBN 3-7861-1339-4, pp. 395–413.
- Wolfgang Steinweg: Das Rathaus in Hannover. Von der Kaiserzeit bis in die Gegenwart. Schlüter, Hannover 1988, ISBN 3-87706-287-3, p. 38f
