= 2025 Roskilde municipal election =

Municipal election in Denmark

← 2021	18 November 2025	2029 →

All 31 seats to the Roskilde municipal council 16 seats needed for a majority
- Turnout: 53,265 (72.8%) ▲2.9%
	First party	Second party	Third party
	A	C	F
Party	Social Democrats	Conservatives	Green Left
Last election	9 seats, 28.0%	5 seats, 15.6%	3 seats, 9.5%
Seats won	7	7	5
Seat change	▼2	▲2	▲2
Popular vote	11,186	10,167	7,784
Percentage	21.3%	19.4%	14.8%
Swing	▼6.7%	▲3.8%	▲5.3%
	Fourth party	Fifth party	Sixth party
	V	Ø	I
Party	Venstre	Red-Green Alliance	Liberal Alliance
Last election	5 seats, 16.0%	3 seats, 8.9%	1 seat, 4.4%
Seats won	3	3	2
Seat change	▼2	0	▲1
Popular vote	5,285	4,140	3,928
Percentage	10.1%	7.9%	7.5%
Swing	▼5.9%	▼1.0%	▲3.1%
	Seventh party	Eighth party	Ninth party
	O	B	L
Party	Danish People's Party	Social Liberals	Lokallisten Roskilde
Last election	2 seats, 6.3%	2 seats, 6.8%	Did not stand
Seats won	2	1	1
Seat change	0	▼1	▲1
Popular vote	3,689	2,753	1,315
Percentage	7.0%	5.2%	2.5%
Swing	▲0.8%	▼1.6%	New
Mayor before election
Tomas Breddam
Social Democrats
Mayor after election
Tomas Breddam
Social Democrats

The 2025 Roskilde Municipal election was held on November 18, 2025, to elect the 31 members to sit in the regional council for the Roskilde Municipal council, in the period of 2026 to 2029. Tomas Breddam from the Social Democrats, would secure re-election.

== Background ==
Following the 2021 election, Tomas Breddam from Social Democrats became mayor for his first full term. He first became mayor after replacing Joy Mogensen. Breddam would lose a vote to become the leading candidate for the party for this election, however, no clear winner emerged from the vote he lost, and a later vote resulted in him becoming the leading candidate anyways. Former Minister of business, Rasmus Jarlov of the Conservatives, was expected to be a major opposing candidate to Breddam's candidacy.

== Electoral system ==
For elections to Danish municipalities, a number varying from 9 to 31 are chosen to be elected to the municipal council. The seats are then allocated using the D'Hondt method and a closed list proportional representation. Roskilde Municipality had 31 seats in 2025.

== Electoral alliances ==
=== Electoral Alliance 1 ===
Party		Political alignment
B	Social Liberals	Centre to Centre-left
F	Green Left	Centre-left to Left-wing
Ø	Red-Green Alliance	Left-wing to Far-Left
Å	The Alternative	Centre-left to Left-wing

=== Electoral Alliance 2 ===
Party		Political alignment
C	Conservatives	Centre-right
I	Liberal Alliance	Centre-right to Right-wing
V	Venstre	Centre-right
Æ	Denmark Democrats	Right-wing to Far-right

=== Electoral Alliance 3 ===
Party		Political alignment
L	Lokallisten Roskilde	Local politics
O	Danish People's Party	Right-wing to Far-right

== Results by polling station ==
Division	A	B	C	F	I	L	M	O	V	Æ	Ø	Å
Division	%	%	%	%	%	%	%	%	%	%	%	%
Roskilde Bymidte	17.9	5.9	18.3	17.6	8.8	2.1	3.7	5.1	7.4	0.6	12.0	0.6
Klostermarken	22.3	6.5	21.4	15.1	8.0	2.3	2.9	4.5	8.4	0.5	7.6	0.6
Sankt Jørgen	23.0	6.7	13.5	22.2	5.6	2.1	2.3	5.9	6.4	0.9	10.9	0.5
Hedegårdene	21.5	6.5	15.1	17.6	7.5	2.0	2.3	8.4	6.5	1.0	10.7	0.8
Østervang	21.7	6.2	16.6	16.6	7.7	2.9	1.8	7.6	6.1	0.9	10.9	0.8
Himmelev	19.5	7.8	22.3	13.4	8.7	1.5	3.1	4.5	10.7	0.6	7.3	0.5
Svogerslev	22.9	4.0	14.4	18.4	6.6	1.9	2.1	10.5	13.9	0.8	4.2	0.3
Vindinge	27.9	3.8	21.2	11.9	7.6	3.0	3.1	6.6	9.0	1.2	4.3	0.3
Vor Frue	12.8	2.5	17.1	23.6	10.7	3.3	2.2	10.3	7.4	2.3	7.0	0.9
Tjørnegård	22.7	5.3	16.9	18.0	6.1	2.2	2.2	8.6	5.5	1.1	10.9	0.6
Gundsølille	17.7	4.0	10.3	9.5	5.3	1.4	1.5	8.5	33.7	1.6	5.5	1.0
Jyllinge	19.3	3.0	34.2	7.5	9.4	1.6	4.0	7.6	8.4	1.2	2.9	0.8
Gundsømagle	21.7	3.4	16.6	9.4	11.1	2.6	2.6	11.4	13.4	2.1	5.5	0.3
Baunehøj	20.5	2.5	31.1	8.1	9.4	1.8	3.3	8.5	9.7	1.6	2.9	0.5
Gadstrup	21.2	3.2	33.0	9.4	4.6	2.7	2.0	7.7	9.4	2.3	4.3	0.4
Viby	24.6	3.1	14.0	10.3	6.3	7.1	1.1	8.0	18.4	2.0	4.9	0.2
Snoldelev	18.1	2.9	23.5	11.4	5.5	2.2	1.7	13.7	14.5	3.2	2.7	0.5
Trekronerskolen, HALLEN	20.9	7.6	14.8	21.0	6.0	2.7	2.0	2.8	6.2	0.3	14.5	1.2

== Results ==
Party		Votes	%	+/-	Seats	+/-
Roskilde Municipality
A	Social Democrats	11,186	21.32	-6.71	7	-2
C	Conservatives	10,167	19.38	+3.76	7	+2
F	Green Left	7,784	14.84	+5.33	5	+2
V	Venstre	5,285	10.07	-5.90	3	-2
Ø	Red-Green Alliance	4,140	7.89	-1.04	3	0
I	Liberal Alliance	3,928	7.49	+3.08	2	+1
O	Danish People's Party	3,689	7.03	+0.75	2	0
B	Social Liberals	2,753	5.25	-1.60	1	-1
M	Moderates	1,321	2.52	New	0	New
L	Lokallisten Roskilde	1,315	2.51	New	1	New
Æ	Denmark Democrats	574	1.09	New	0	New
Å	The Alternative	323	0.62	+0.18	0	0
Total		52,465	100	N/A	31	N/A
Invalid votes		160	0.22	0.0		
Blank votes		640	0.88	+0.08		
Turnout		53,265	72.84	+2.87		
Source: valg.dk

== Opinion polls ==
Polling firm	Fieldwork date	Sample size	A	V	C	F	Ø	B	O	I	Å	L	M	Æ	Others	Lead
Epinion	4 Sep - 13 Oct 2025	508	21.9	13.0	8.5	17.4	9.9	5.5	5.2	9.8	0.9	–	–	–	0.0	4.5
Sjællandske-Nyheder		301	19.4	9.7	15.0	16.4	11.8	3.9	–	12.7	2.7	–	1.4	0.7	–	3.0
2024 european parliament election	9 Jun 2024		14.6	14.2	9.2	20.2	6.9	8.7	5.5	7.3	2.5	–	7.4	3.6	–	5.6
2022 general election	1 Nov 2022		25.0	12.2	5.4	12.4	5.1	4.6	2.6	8.6	3.1	–	12.8	4.6	–	12.2
2021 regional election	16 Nov 2021		26.8	16.7	15.2	12.5	8.2	6.1	5.7	3.6	0.4	–	–	–	–	10.1
2021 municipal election	16 Nov 2021		28.0 (9)	16.0 (5)	15.6 (5)	9.5 (3)	8.9 (3)	6.8 (2)	6.3 (2)	4.4 (1)	0.4 (0)	–	–	–	–	12.0
