= 2021 Roskilde municipal election =

← 2017	16 November 2021	2025 →

All 31 seats to the Roskilde Municipal Council 16 seats needed for a majority
- Turnout: 49,177 (70.0%) ▼4.1pp
	First party	Second party	Third party
	A	V	C
Party	Social Democrats	Venstre	Conservatives
Last election	16 seats, 45.8%	6 seats, 18.5%	2 seats, 5.5%
Seats won	9	5	5
Seat change	▼7	▼1	▲3
Popular vote	13,571	7,733	7,563
Percentage	28.0%	16.0%	15.6%
Swing	▼17.8%	▼2.5%	▲10.1%
	Fourth party	Fifth party	Sixth party
	F	Ø	B
Party	Green Left	Red–Green Alliance	Social Liberals
Last election	1 seat, 4.9%	2 seats, 7.2%	1 seat, 4.1%
Seats won	3	3	2
Seat change	▲2	▲1	▲1
Popular vote	4,601	4,324	3,313
Percentage	9.5%	8.9%	6.8%
Swing	▲4.6%	▲1.7%	▲2.7%
	Seventh party	Eighth party	Ninth party
	O	I	D
Party	Danish People's Party	Liberal Alliance	New Right
Last election	3 seats, 9.2%	0 seats, 2.5%	Did Not Stand
Seats won	2	1	1
Seat change	▼1	▲1	▲1
Popular vote	3,039	2,132	1,411
Percentage	6.3%	4.4%	2.9%
Swing	▼2.9%	▲1.9%	New
Mayor before election
Tomas Breddam (Note: Joy Mogensen became mayor following last election, however she resigned in 2019)
Social Democrats
Mayor after election
Tomas Breddam
Social Democrats

Ever since the 2007 municipal reform, the Social Democrats had held the mayor's position in Roskilde Municipality. In the 2017 election, they had won their first absolute majority in the municipality. It would be Joy Mogensen who would continue following this result.

Following the 2019 Danish general election, Joy Mogensen received the offer to become minister of Church and Culture. She would eventually accept and step down as mayor. Tomas Breddam would become the new mayor following the resignation of Joy Mogensen.

Joy Mogensen had received the 5th highest number of personal votes in the 2017 Danish local elections, despite Roskilde Municipality only being the 14th most populated municipality in Denmark. Her popularity would become even more evident, when the results of this election had been counted. The Social Democrats would lose 7 seats, and win 9 seats in total. The Social Liberals had prior to the election said that they'd neither support a red nor blue mayor. Without them, the red bloc had won 15 seats, while the blue bloc had won 14 seats. However the Social Liberals would later announce, that would be ready to support Jette Tjørnelund from Venstre as mayor. This came after the other blue parties wanted to have Lars Lindskov from the Conservatives become the new mayor. However, Liberal Alliance was sceptical on Jette Tjørnelund becoming the mayor. Therefore, no candidate appeared to have a majority behind them. In the end Danish People's Party decided to join the red bloc parties of the Social Democrats, Green Left and Red–Green Alliance. This would see Tomas Breddam continue as mayor.

== Electoral system ==
For elections to Danish municipalities, a number varying from 9 to 31 are chosen to be elected to the municipal council. The seats are then allocated using the D'Hondt method and a closed list proportional representation. Roskilde Municipality had 31 seats in 2021

Unlike in Danish General Elections, in elections to municipal councils, electoral alliances are allowed.

== Electoral alliances ==
=== Electoral Alliance 1 ===
Party		Political alignment
D	New Right	Right-wing to Far-right
I	Liberal Alliance	Centre-right to Right-wing
O	Danish People's Party	Right-wing to Far-right

=== Electoral Alliance 2 ===
Party		Political alignment
F	Green Left	Centre-left to Left-wing
G	Vegan Party	Single-issue
Ø	Red–Green Alliance	Left-wing to Far-Left
Å	The Alternative	Centre-left to Left-wing

=== Electoral Alliance 3 ===
Party		Political alignment
B	Social Liberals	Centre to Centre-left
C	Conservatives	Centre-right
K	Christian Democrats	Centre to Centre-right
V	Venstre	Centre-right

== Results by polling station ==
M = Michael Phlip Hansen-listen

Division	A	B	C	D	F	G	I	K	M	O	V	Ø	Å
Division	%	%	%	%	%	%	%	%	%	%	%	%	%
Roskilde Bymidte	26.5	7.8	16.7	2.1	10.4	0.3	6.2	0.4	0.4	4.2	11.0	13.9	0.3
Klostermarken	27.9	8.0	17.7	1.7	9.8	0.4	5.6	0.2	0.3	4.8	13.0	10.1	0.3
Sankt Jørgen	31.5	8.6	11.4	2.4	13.7	0.4	3.7	0.4	0.2	5.6	9.6	12.3	0.3
Hedegårdene	33.4	7.9	10.6	2.1	11.9	0.7	4.5	0.7	0.2	7.3	9.0	11.0	0.9
Vindinge	21.8	5.2	14.4	3.5	8.8	0.2	7.6	0.7	0.1	16.0	16.0	5.4	0.2
Svogerslev	26.0	6.2	14.0	1.9	9.2	0.1	2.3	0.4	0.6	10.5	22.9	5.4	0.4
Himmelev	24.9	8.3	17.8	2.1	8.8	0.4	6.9	0.2	0.2	3.8	17.2	9.0	0.4
Østervang	33.8	9.2	11.7	2.8	9.1	0.8	4.8	0.5	0.3	6.8	9.1	10.9	0.3
Vor Frue	21.5	4.9	11.7	4.3	12.4	0.5	3.4	0.2	0.6	8.0	19.2	12.1	1.2
Æblehaven	37.1	6.7	10.2	2.9	10.6	0.6	4.0	0.5	0.4	7.2	8.9	10.2	0.7
Gundsølille	21.3	6.0	11.0	4.8	6.9	0.6	2.5	0.1	0.3	5.8	33.3	6.6	0.7
Jyllinge	25.1	3.3	33.7	4.2	6.8	0.2	3.3	0.2	0.1	4.7	14.9	3.2	0.3
Viby	27.3	3.8	9.9	3.2	8.1	0.4	3.7	0.7	0.5	7.0	29.8	5.1	0.3
Gadstrup	31.8	4.3	14.3	4.1	9.1	0.3	2.8	0.2	0.6	7.4	20.3	4.3	0.3
Baunehøj	25.1	3.2	30.7	3.6	6.9	0.1	3.4	0.1	0.3	5.5	17.6	3.5	0.1
Gundsømagle	27.8	3.5	12.7	4.8	6.4	0.1	3.0	0.2	0.1	8.4	28.5	4.3	0.2
Snoldelev	24.1	4.5	17.5	8.4	8.0	0.0	1.7	1.0	0.5	9.6	19.2	5.1	0.3
Dåstrup	21.3	4.7	10.9	4.3	9.4	1.0	5.8	0.7	0.3	6.5	29.2	5.4	0.4
Trekroner	26.6	11.8	12.0	1.7	10.8	0.7	4.0	0.2	0.1	2.3	11.3	17.8	0.8

== Results ==
Party		Votes	%	+/-	Seats	+/-
Roskilde Municipality
A	Social Democrats	13,571	28.03	-17.73	9	-7
V	Venstre	7,733	15.97	-2.49	5	-1
C	Conservatives	7,563	15.62	+10.15	5	+3
F	Green Left	4,601	9.50	+4.64	3	+2
Ø	Red-Green Alliance	4,324	8.93	+1.78	3	+1
B	Social Liberals	3,313	6.84	+2.78	2	+1
O	Danish People's Party	3,039	6.28	-2.97	2	-1
I	Liberal Alliance	2,132	4.40	+1.93	1	+1
D	New Right	1,411	2.91	New	1	New
Å	The Alternative	211	0.44	-1.91	0	0
G	Vegan Party	204	0.42	New	0	New
K	Christian Democrats	179	0.37	+0.21	0	0
M	Michael Philip Hansen-listen	133	0.27	New	0	New
Total		48,414	100	N/A	31	N/A
Invalid votes		153	0.22	+0.02		
Blank votes		610	0.87	+0.17		
Turnout		49,177	69.97	-4.15		
Source: valg.dk
