= Gundsø =

Former municipality in Denmark

Coordinates: 55°44′07″N 12°09′00″E

Gundsø Municipality's location in Denmark.

Gundsø was a municipality (Danish, kommune) in Roskilde county on the island of Zealand (Sjælland) in East Denmark. 1 January 2007 the municipality of Gundsø merged with the municipality of Roskilde and the municipality of Ramsø as a result of the structural reform. The area of Gundsø municipality was 64 km^{2}, with a total population of 15,749 (2005). Its last mayor was Evan Lynnerup, a member of the Venstre (Liberal Party) political party. Towns in the municipality included Herringløse, Gundsølille, Gundsømagle, Jyllinge (the municipality's largest town), Østrup Holme, and Ågerup.
The municipality was created in 1970 due to a kommunalreform ("Municipality Reform") that combined a number of existing parishes:

- Gundsømagle Parish
- Hvedstrup Parish
- Jyllinge Parish
- Kirkerup Parish
- Ågerup Parish

On 1 January 2007 Gundsø municipality ceased to exist due to Kommunalreformen ("The Municipality Reform" of 2007). It was combined with existing Ramsø and Roskilde municipalities to form the new Roskilde municipality. This created a municipality with an area of 212 km^{2} and a total population of 79,441 (2005). The new municipality belongs to Region Sjælland ("Zealand Region").
