= Danfysik =

- Company type: Wholly owned subsidiary
- Founded: 1964 in Jyllinge, Denmark
- Founder: Ejnar Jespersen
- Headquarters: Taastrup, Denmark
- Key people: Henrik Steen Andersen (CEO)
- Products: Particle accelerators, magnets, power supplies
- Revenue: 19 million DKK (2013)
- Owner: Danish Technological Institute
- Number of employees: 110 (2013)

Danfysik is a Danish developer and manufacturer of particle accelerators for scientific research and medical usage, specialized magnets and particle accelerator power supplies.

== History ==
The company was founded in 1964 by Ejnar Jespersen in Jyllinge. In 1974 it started selling synchrotron magnet systems.

In 2004 Siemens took over the medical particle therapy division of Danfysik. In 2009 Danfysik was bought by the Danish Technological Institute (DTI) and most of the company was moved to a building at DTI's campus. In 2011 the site in Jyllinge was closed.

== Major projects ==
- Karlsruhe Institute of Technology ANKA synchrotron
- University Hospital of Giessen and Marburg light ion accelerator for particle therapy
- Jagiellonian University 1.5 GeV synchrotron
- CERN ISOLDE superconducting solenoids
- Aarhus University ASTRID2 synchrotron magnets and power supplies
- ITER European Dipole 18 kA power supply
- Shanghai Proton and Heavy Ion Center particle accelerator
- MAX IV magnet system
