= Swastika (Germanic Iron Age) =

Swastika use in the Germanic Iron Age

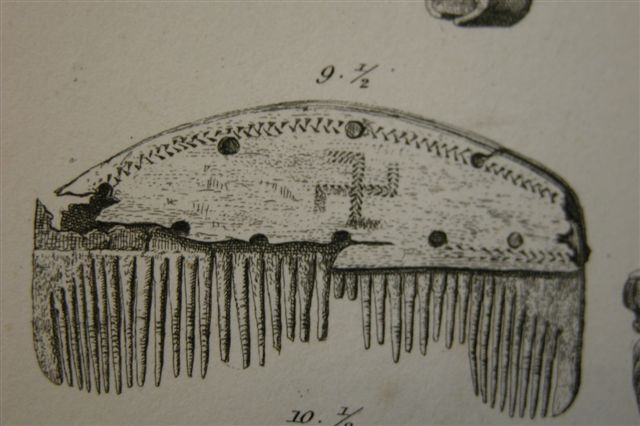
A comb with a sauwastika found in Nydam Mose in Denmark, dating to the 3rd or 4th century CE.

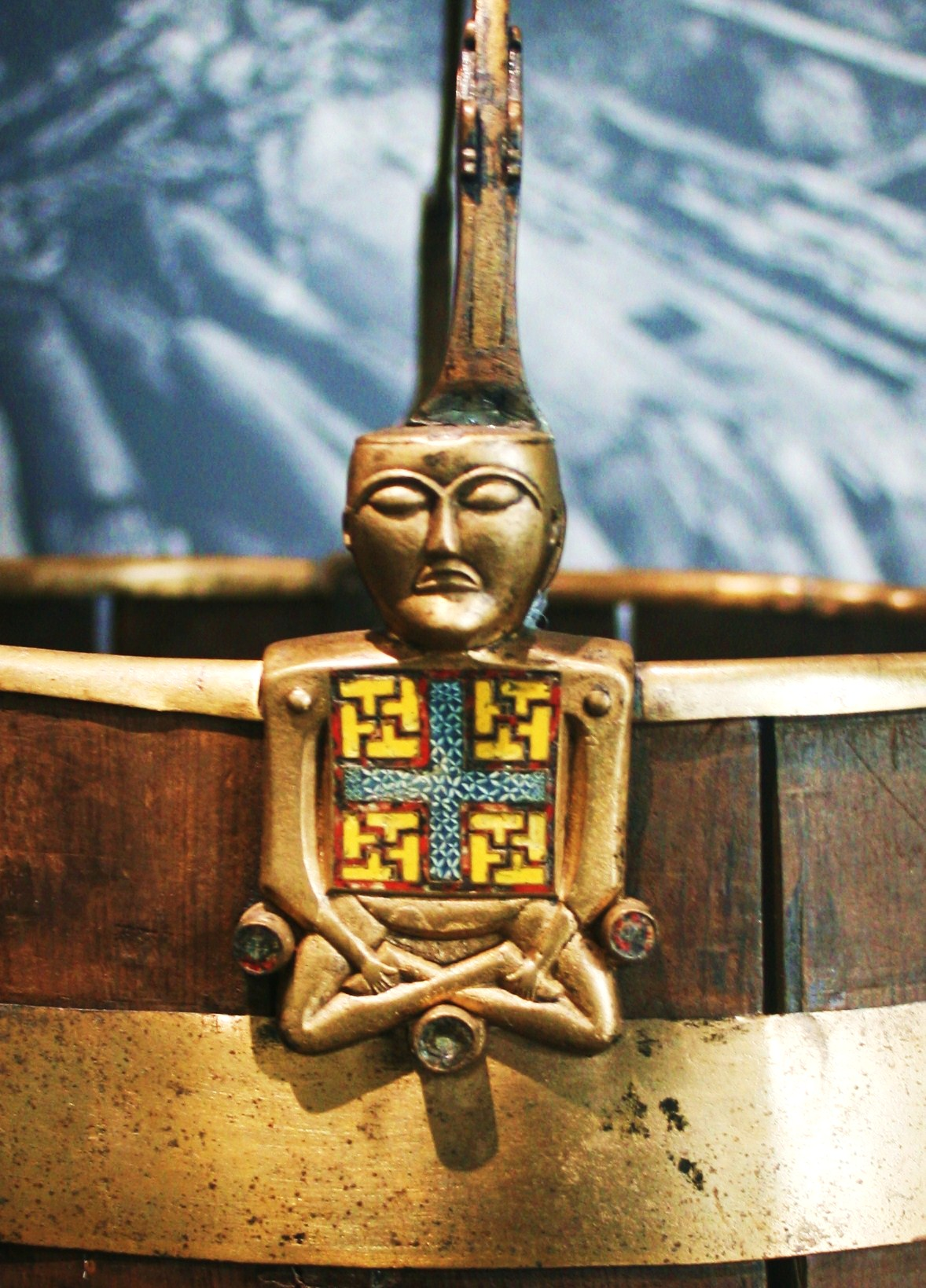
Two swastikas and two sauwastikas in an ornament of a bucket found with the Oseberg ship (ca. AD 800)

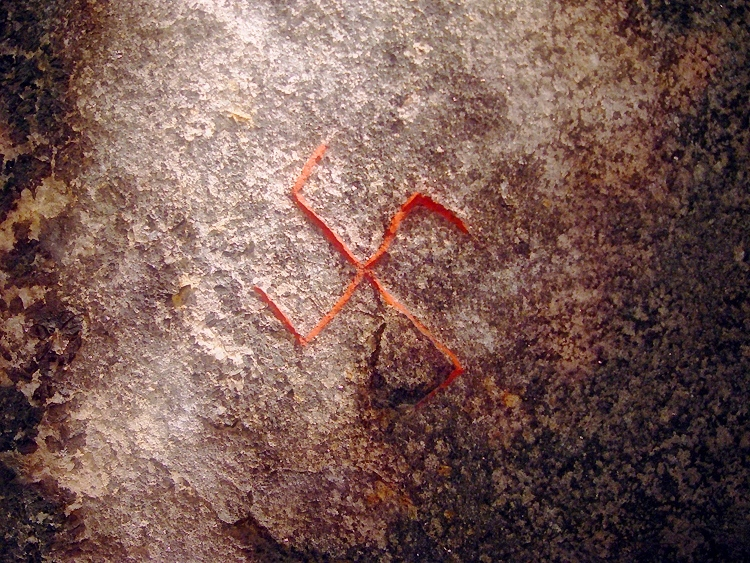
The swastika on the Snoldelev Stone, Denmark (9th century)

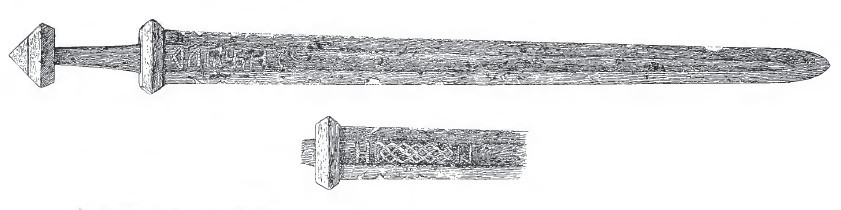
The Sæbø sword with runes and a swastika symbol on one side of the blade.

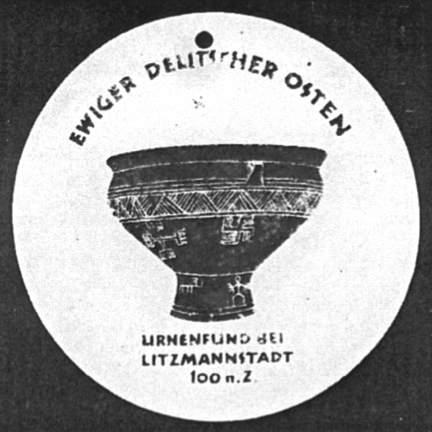
Swastikas found on archaeological artefacts of the Iron Age used in Nazi propaganda: depiction of a swastika-bearing funerary urn of the Przeworsk culture (Sarmatia now Poland 2nd century) on a ceramic medallion issued by the Bund Deutscher Osten.

The swastika design is known from artefacts of various cultures since the Neolithic, and it recurs with some frequency on artefacts dated to the Germanic Iron Age, i.e. the Migration period to Viking Age period in Scandinavia, including the Vendel era in Sweden, attested from as early as the 3rd century in Elder Futhark inscriptions and as late as the 9th century on Viking Age image stones.

In older literature, the symbol is known variously as gammadion, fylfot, crux gothica, flanged thwarts, or angled cross. English use of the Sanskritism swastika for the symbol dates to the 1870s, at first in the context of Hindu and Buddhist traditions, but from the 1890s also in cross-cultural comparison.

Examples include a 2nd-century funerary urn of the Przeworsk culture, Poland, the 3rd century Værløse Fibula from Zealand, Denmark, the Gothic spearhead from Brest-Litovsk, Belarus, the 9th century Snoldelev Stone from Ramsø, Denmark, and numerous Migration Period bracteates. The swastika is drawn either left-facing or right-facing, sometimes with "feet" attached to its four legs. Medallions and bracteates featuring swastikas were issued in Central Europe of late antiquity by the Etruscans.

The symbol is closely related to the triskele, a symbol of three-fold rotational symmetry, which occurs on artefacts of the same period. When considered as a four-fold rotational symmetrical analogue of the triskele, the symbol is sometimes also referred to as tetraskele.

The swastika symbol in the Germanic Iron Age has been interpreted as having a sacral meaning, associated with either Odin or Thor, but the Indoeuropean tradition associates the four-fold swastika with solar deities and deities preceding Thor are rather associated with three-fold or more often six-fold symbology.

== Bracteates ==
A number of bracteates, with or without runic inscriptions, show a swastika. Most of these bracteates are of the "C" type, showing a human head above a quadruped, often interpreted as the Germanic god Woden/Odin. The swastika in most of these cases is placed next to the head. The majority of these swastikas are left-facing (卍), but there are also a number of right-facing (卐) instances. In this context that the direction of the runic inscriptions on bracteates always is right-to-left (the mirror image of the stamp used to produce the bracteates), and in the transcription below the swastika is mirrored to preserve its directionality relative to the reading direction.

Examples where the swastika is part of the inscription include (DR being the Rundata province code for "Denmark"): DR BR12 Darum 4 (lïïaþzet lae : t卐ozrï); DR BR38 Bolbro 1 and DR BR40 Allesø (both zlut : eaþl lauz 卐 owa); DR BR41 Vedby (...] lauz 卐 owa); DR BR53 Maglemose 2 (卍(l)kaz). In those inscriptions the swastika and sauwastika may represent the word swar cognate with Iranian xwar.

== Anglo-Saxon England ==
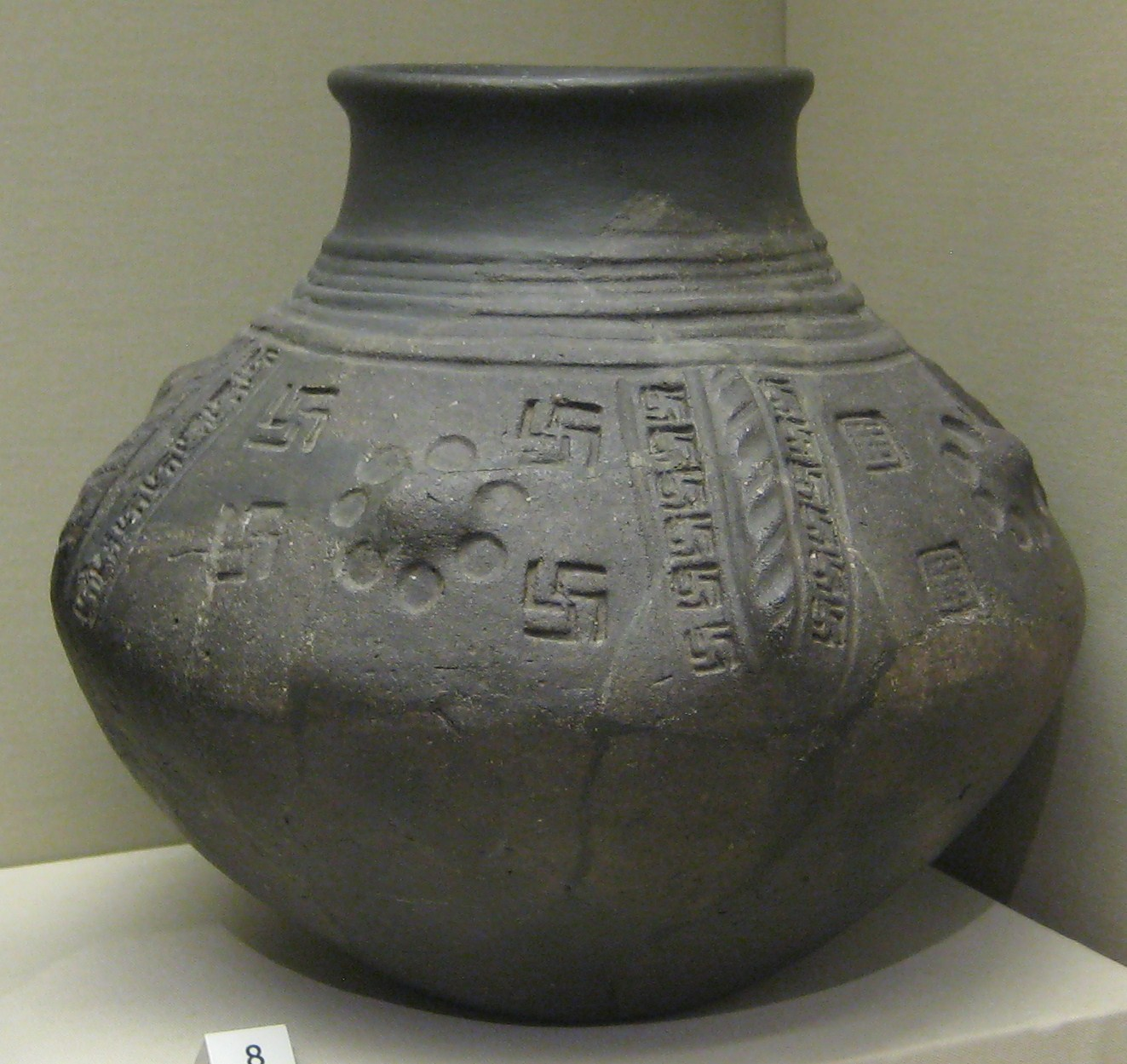
An early Anglo-Saxon (5th to 6th century) cinerary urn with swastika motifs, found at North Elmham, Norfolk (now in the British Museum)

The early Anglo-Saxon ship burial at Sutton Hoo, England, contained numerous items bearing the swastika, now housed in the collection of the Cambridge Museum of Archaeology and Anthropology. The Swastika is clearly marked on a hilt and sword belt found at Bifrons in Bekesbourne, Kent, in a grave of about the 6th century.

== Interpretation ==
Hilda Ellis Davidson theorized that the swastika symbol was associated with Thor, possibly representing his hammer Mjolnir – symbolic of thunder – and possibly being connected to the Bronze Age sun cross. Davidson cites "many examples" of the swastika symbol from Anglo-Saxon graves of the pagan period, with particular prominence on cremation urns from the cemeteries of East Anglia. Some of the swastikas on the items, on display at the Cambridge Museum of Archaeology and Anthropology, are depicted with such care and art that, according to Davidson, it must have possessed special significance as a funerary symbol. The runic inscription on the Sæbø sword (c. AD 800) has been taken as evidence of the swastika as a symbol of Thor in Norse paganism.

== See also ==
- Kolovrat
- Valknut
