= Sæbø sword =

Viking sword

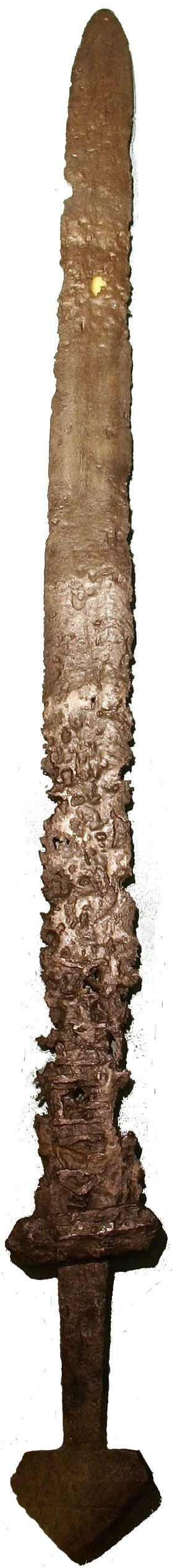
- The Sæbø sword as on display at Bergen Museum
- Material: Iron and steel, with iron inlays on blade.
- Size: 95 cm (37 in) total length (78 cm (31 in) blade)
- Created: 800-850
- Discovered: 1825; Sæbø, Vik, Sogn
- Present location: Bergen Museum
- Registration: museum no. B1622

The Sæbø sword (also known as the Thurmuth sword) is an early 9th-century Viking sword, found in a barrow at Sæbø in Vikøyri, in Norway's Sogn region in 1825. It is now held at the Bergen Museum in Bergen, Norway.

The sword has an inscription on its blade, which has been identified by George Stephens (1867) as a runic inscription incorporating a swastika symbol. The blade is poorly preserved, and the inscription barely legible, but if Stephens' interpretation is correct, the sword would be a unique example of a Viking-era sword with a runic blade inscription.

== Description ==
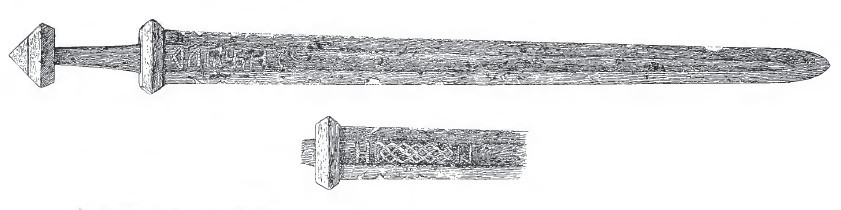
Drawing by George Stephens of the Sæbø sword and detail of inlaid decoration on the reverse

The sword itself is categorized as 'Type C' by Petersen (1919), who notes that it is unique in showing remnants of a metal thread at the broadsides of the upper hilt, compared to other specimens of the type which show horizontal ridges or protruding edges, or less commonly inlaid forged stripes or protruding moldings that seem to be imitations of twisted or smooth thread. It is described as an imitation of a foreign [continental] sword inscription because of the lack of parallels in native tradition. There is an inscription realised in iron inlay along the center of the blade, close to the hilt.

== Inscription ==
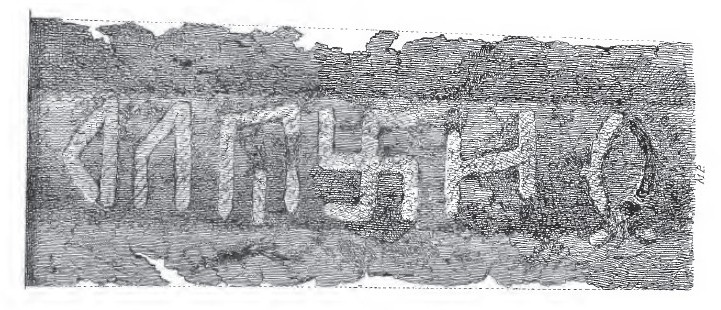
drawing of the inscription as published by Stephens.

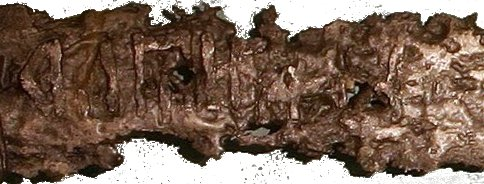
Remnants of the inscription as on display at Bergen Museum

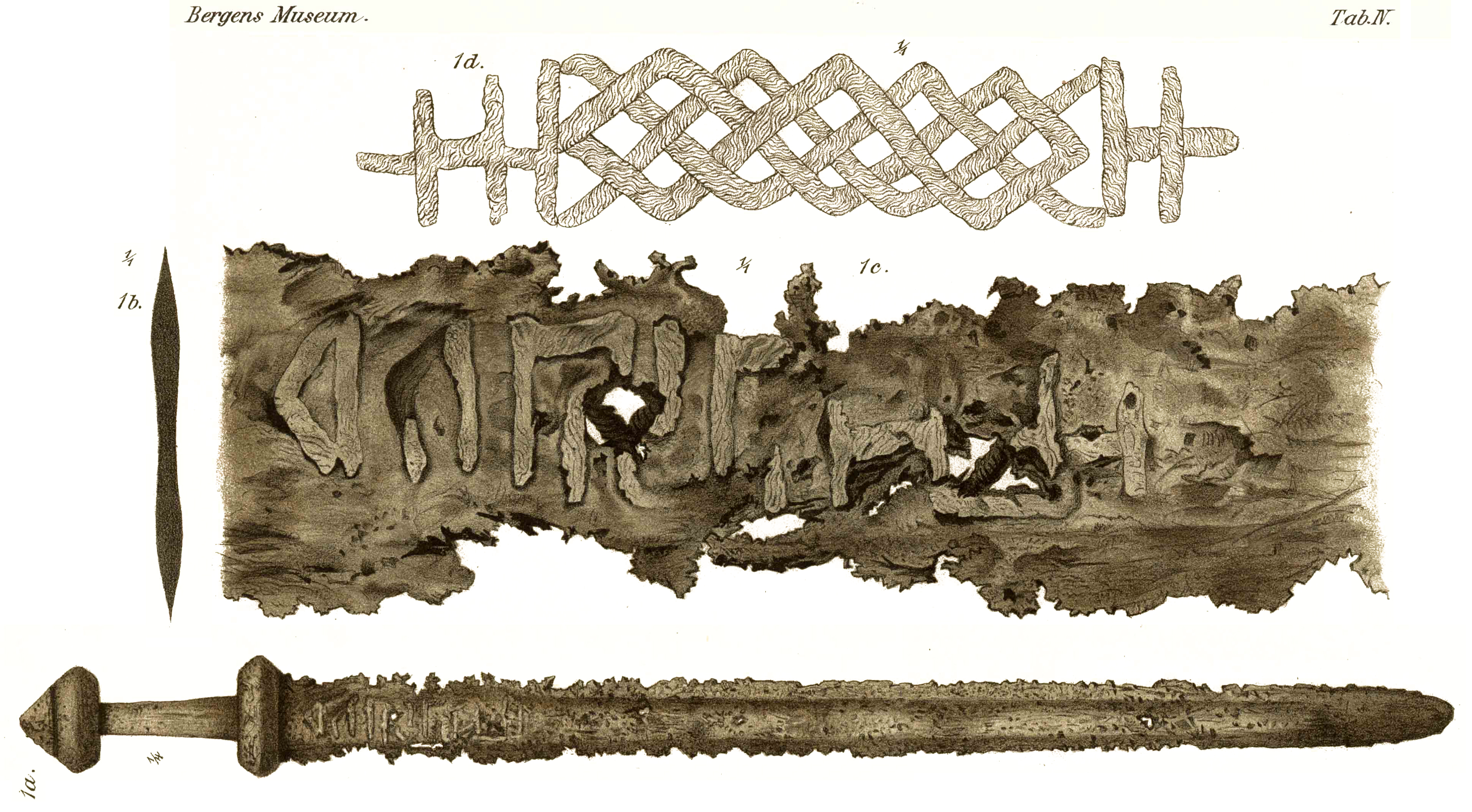
Drawing from table IV in the book "Den yngre jernalders sværd" by Anders Lorange, 1889.

The sword was described in 1867 by George Stephens, an English archaeologist and philologist who specialised in the runic inscriptions of Scandinavia, in his book Handbook of the Old-Northern Runic Monuments of Scandinavia and England. In this work he showed a drawing of the sword with a very clear inscription comprising five runes or rune-like letters with a swastika symbol in the middle. According to Stephens the inscription reads oh卍muþ from right to left. He interpreted the swastika as being used in rebus-writing to represent the syllable þur for the god Thor, and thus expanded the reading to oh Þurmuþ meaning "Owns [me], Thurmuth". This reading was inspired by the idea that the swastika was used as a symbol of Thor (more precisely, of Thor's hammer) in Viking Age Norse paganism. It was the subject of scholarly discussion at the International Congress of Anthropology and Prehistoric Archæology at Budapest in 1876, where the prevalent opinion was that the swastika stood for "blessing" or "good luck".

In 1889, in a review of a book by A. L. Lorange, Stephens noted that the sword had been treated with acid whilst at the Danish Museum, with the result that the sword and its inscription were severely damaged, and consequently the inscription shown in a colour plate in Lorange's book was undecipherable.

== See also ==
- Seax of Beagnoth, an Anglo-Saxon seax with a runic inscription on its blade
- Swastika (Germanic Iron Age)
