= Argo (Danish company) =

Danish waste company

Argo (formerly Kara/Noveren) is a Danish waste management company owned by nine municipalities in the western and southern part of metropolitan Copenhagen, Denmark. In 2014, Kara/Noveren inaugurated a new, energy-efficient waste-to-energy plant in Roskilde, Energitårnet ("The Energy Tower"), designed by Erick Van Egeraat.

== History ==
The company was established as Kara/Noveren in 2007 through the merger of Kara and Noveren. In 2017, it was renamed Argo. The new name is short for "affald – ressourcer – genbrug - overskud".

== Company ==
Argo is owned by Greve, Holbæk, Kalundborg, Køge, Lejre, Odsherred, Roskilde, Solrød, and Stevns municipalities. The company has some 400,000 private and 22,500 commercial customers.

== The Energy Tower ==
The Energy Tower waste-to-energy plant was inaugurated on 2 September 2014. The cost of its construction was DKK 1.3 billion. The facility produces electricity for approximately 65,000 households and district heating for 40,000 households, utilizing close to 100% of the energy in the waste as opposed to only 70 % in the old oven line. The electricity is sold to SEAS-NVE while the heat is sold to Roskilde Forsyning.

The building is the result of an architectural competition won by Erick Van Egeraat in 2010. The building has a two-layered façade, the outer layer consists of amber-colored aluminum plates with laser-cut circular openings. A backlighting scheme creates a spark which for a few minutes every hour gradually illuminates the entire building.
