= Martin Ågerup =

Danish economist (born 1966)

- Born: 1966 (age 59–60); Birkerød, Denmark
- Education: Copenhagen University

Martin Ågerup (born 1966) is a Danish economist who founded and served as the first president of the think tank CEPOS from 2004 to 2023. He is a Fellow of the International Policy Network.

== Early life and education ==
Ågerup was born in the town of Birkerød in the northern outskirts of Copenhagen in 1966. He graduated from the European School of Luxembourg IN 1982 and obtained a master's degree in economy and economic history from the University of Bristol in 1991.

== Career ==
From 1992 until 1998 he worked as a researcher at the Copenhagen Institute for Futures Studies and he then worked as a management consultant at connector a/s from 1998 until 2002. Between 2002 and 2004, he was an independent consultant associated with GCI Future. He is a former member of the Danish European Movement's Executive Committee and a member of its think tank "Yes to Europe". He became president of CEPOS in 2004.

== Private life ==
Martin Ågerup is married to Ulla Ågerup with whom he has two children. The family lives in Svogerslev outside Roskilde.

== Publications ==
Ågerup has authored a number of debate books:

- "Dommedag er aflyst – velstand og fremgang i det 21. århundrede", Gyldendal, 1998. (in Danish)
- "Enerne – om at leve og arbejde i det 21. århundredes første årti". Borgen, 2001. (in Danish)
- "Den retfærdige ulighed". CEPOS, 2007. (in Danish)
