= Viby, Roskilde Municipality =

Viby
- Town
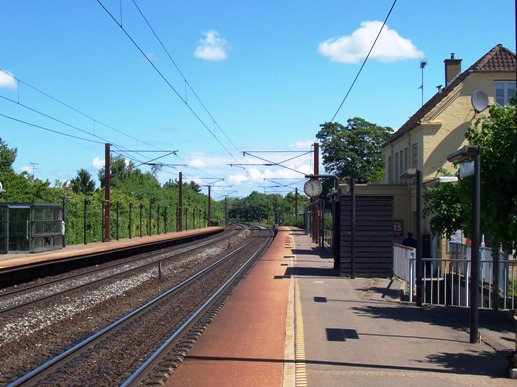
- Viby railway station

- Location in Denmark Viby (Denmark Region Zealand)
- Coordinates: 55°33′4″N 12°1′22″E
- Country: Denmark
- Region: Zealand (Sjælland)
- Municipality: Roskilde

Area
  - Urban: 2.7 km^{2} (1.0 sq mi)

Population (2026)
  - Urban: 5,227
  - Urban density: 1,900/km^{2} (5,000/sq mi)
  - Gender: 2,539 males and 2,688 females
- Time zone: UTC+1 (CET)
  - Summer (DST): UTC+2 (CEST)
- Postal code: DK-4130 Viby Sjælland

Viby, often referred to as Viby Sjælland (usually styled Viby Sj) to distinguish it from Viby J in Jutland, is a satellite and commuter town to Roskilde and Copenhagen, located 8 km south of Roskilde, in Roskilde Municipality, some 30 km west of Copenhagen, Denmark. The original village, now Gammel Viby ("Old Viby"), is located in the northern part of town while the modern district has formed around Viby railway station which opened on the Danish Main Line between Copenhagen and western Denmark in 1854. The village of Dåstrup is now also an integrated part of Viby. As of 1 January 2026, Viby had a population of 5,227.

== History ==
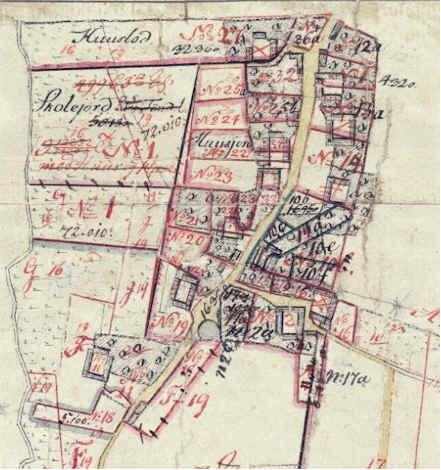
Old Viby in 1805

The name Viby is first documented in 1257 as Wicby (Vigby 1315). In the Middle Ages, Viby consisted of 12 farms. Most of these were owned by various prebends associated with the cathedral chapter in Roskilde while one was owned by Our Lady's Abbey. The farms' land was located to the south. Viby was located in the southernmost part of the parish of Syv. Syv in the northern part of the parish consisted of two villages: Syv Kirkeby in the west, with the church, rectory and two farms, and Øster Syv in the east with eight farms in 1682. The area between Syv and Viby was owned by Vibygård, a manor house located on the eastern outskirts of Viby. A short distance to the west of Viby was the village of Dåstrup.

The first railway in Denmark was built between Copenhagen and Roskilde. Viby Station opened ten years later when the railway was extended to Korsør. A new district gradually developed around the station which was located to the south of the old village.

In the 1960, Viby was expanded with new neighbourhoods of single family detached homes. In 1970, the town was selected as seat of the new Ramsø Municipality. In 2007, Ramsø was merged with Roskilde Municipality.

== Facilities ==
Søndergade is the main shopping street.

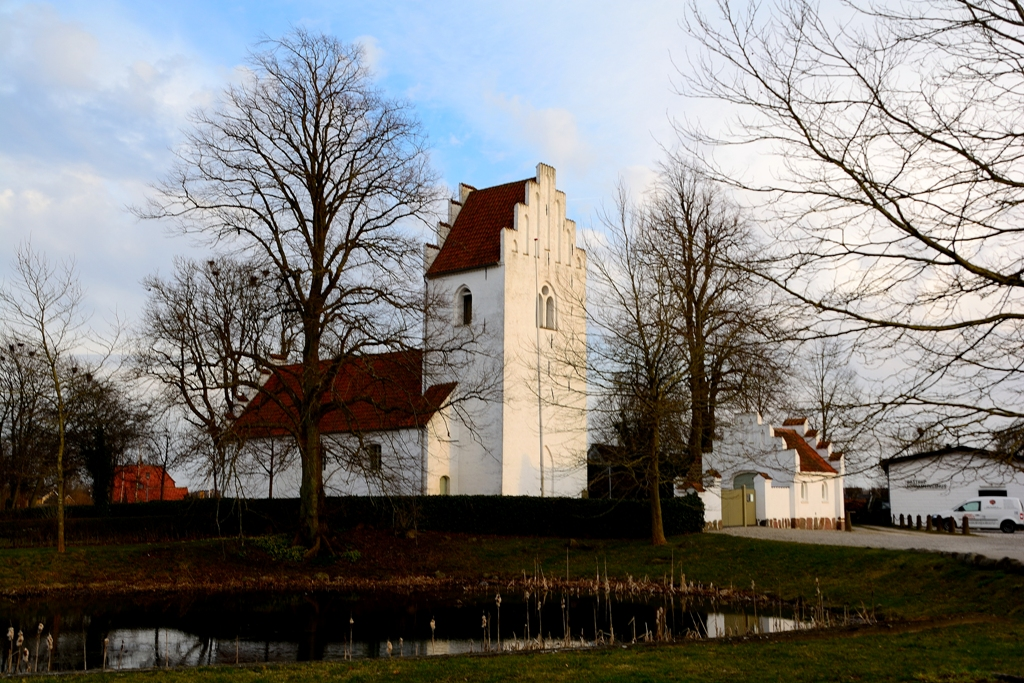
Dåstrup Church

There are three primary schools, two public and one private: Peder Syv's School in Viby, Dåstrup School in Dåstrup and Viby Friskole (private) in Gammel Viby.

== Landmarks ==
Vedbygård's current main building dates from 1857. The estate is farmed organically. Syv Church mostly dates from about 1500. The current church replaced a smaller Romanesque church. The northern section of the wall that surrounds the church cuts through a burial mound. There is also a church in Dåstrup.

== Transport ==
Viby railway station is served by regional rails between Copenhagen and Ringsted. The travel time is seven minutes to Roskilde and 38 minutes to Copenhagen Central Station.

Viby is located 2.5 km east of Danish national road 7 which links Helsingør on the coast north of Copenhagen with Køge on the coast south of Copenhagen by way of Hillerød and Roskilde..

== Notable people ==
- Bryan Rice (born 1978 in Dåstrup), pop singer and songwriter
- Mette Schjoldager (born 1977), badminton player
- Peder Syv (1631–1702), philologist, folklorist and priest,
