= Herringlose =

Village in Denmark

Coordinates: 55.712°N 12.213°E

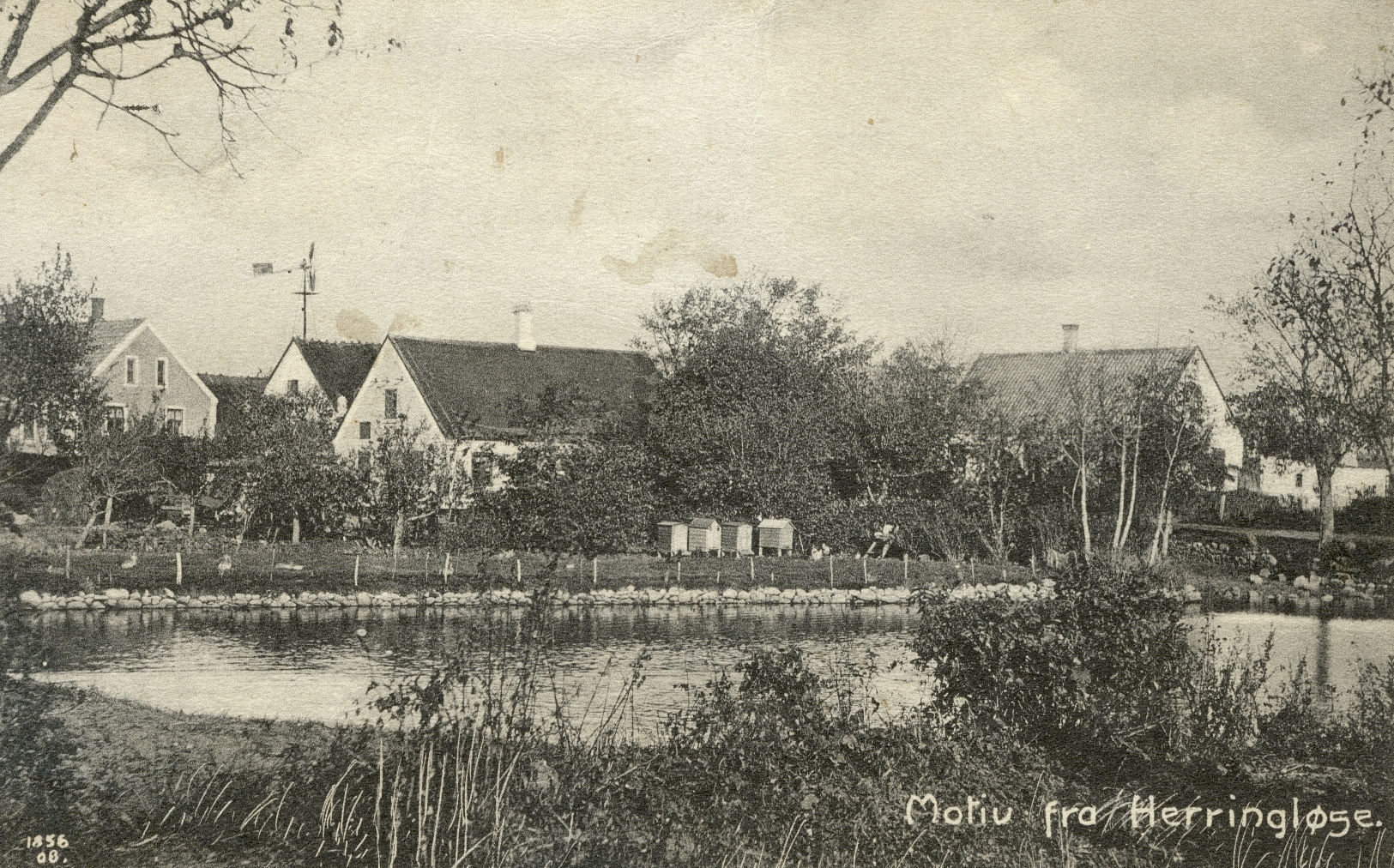
Herringløse

Herringlose (Danish: Herringløse) is a village with a population of 378 (1 January 2026) in Roskilde municipality, Denmark.
