= Snoldelev Stone =

9th-century Danish runestone

Coordinates: 55°34′18″N 12°07′17″E

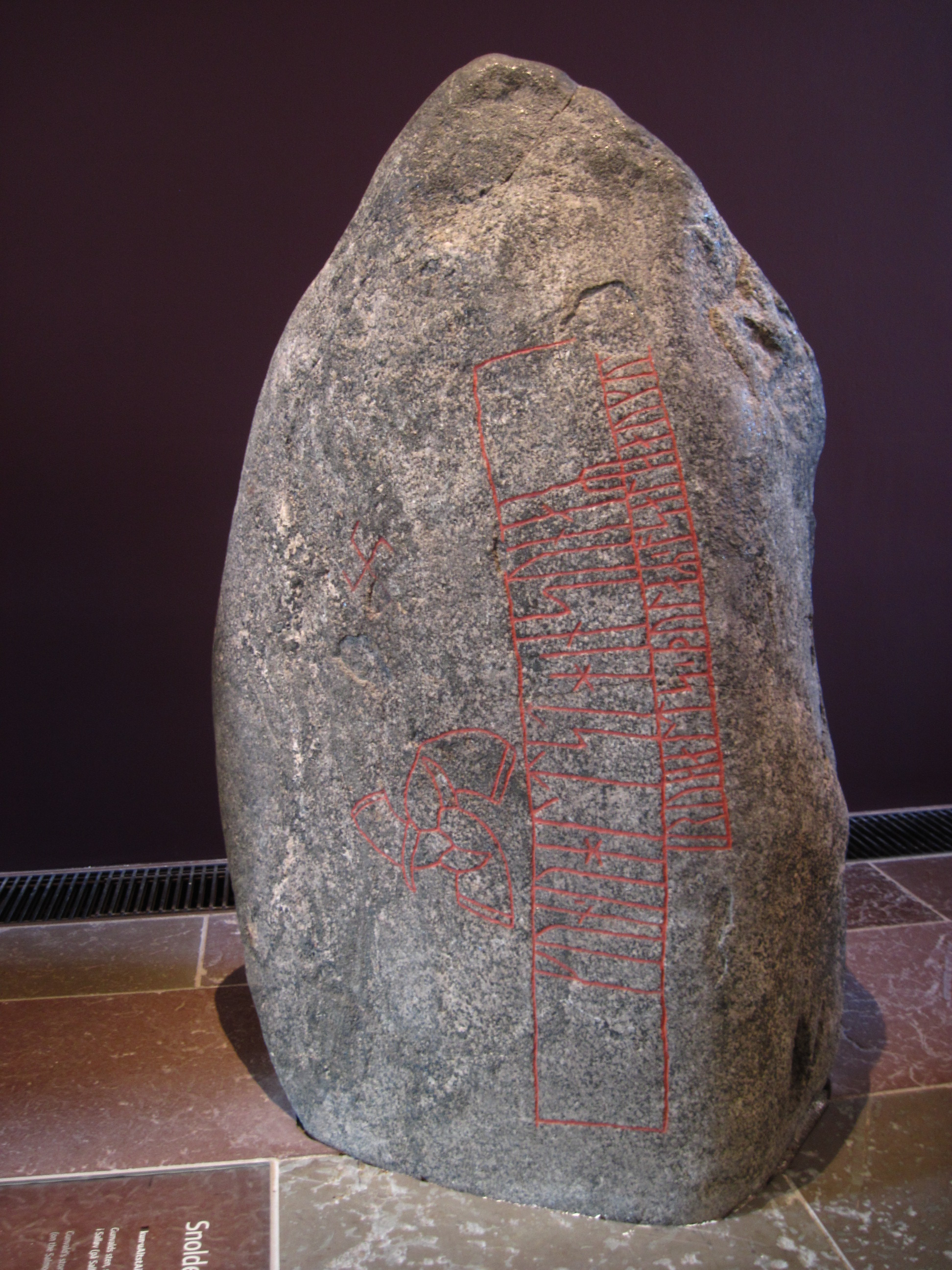
- Height: 1.25 meters
- Writing: Younger futhark
- Symbols: interlaced horns; swastika
- Created: 9th century AD
- Discovered: c. 1775; Snoldelev, Ramsø, Denmark
- Discovered by: farmers
- Present location: National Museum of Denmark in Copenhagen
- Culture: Norse
- Rundata ID: DR 248
- Runemaster: unknown

Text – Native
- Gunwalds sten, sonaʀ Roalds, þulaʀ a Salhøgum.

Translation
- Gunnvaldr's stone, Hróaldr's son, reciter of Salhaugar

The Snoldelev Stone, listed as DR 248 in the Rundata catalog, is a 9th-century runestone that was originally located at Snoldelev, Ramsø, Denmark.

== Description ==
The Snoldelev Stone was first noted in 1810 and was turned over to the national Antiquities Commission in 1811. The runestone is now housed at the National Museum of Denmark in Copenhagen, Denmark. It is 1.25 metres (4 ft 1 in) in height.

The stone is decorated with painted scratches depicting a design of three horns, possibly drinking horns, interlaced into a triangle as incomplete Borromean rings (similar to the Diane de Poitiers three crescents emblem). This symbol is also known from the Viking Age picture stone from Lillbjärs on Gotland. It is not known if or how it is related to the similarly triangular valknut, which appears aside the interlaced horns on the Lillbjärs stone.

The inscription on the Snoldelev Stone shows an early version of the Younger Futhark. Like the late Elder Futhark Björketorp Runestone, it uses an a-rune which has the same form as the h-rune has in the long-branch version of the younger futhark. This a-rune is transliterated with a capital A below. The Snoldelev runestone also retains the elder futhark haglaz rune for the h-phoneme and this is represented by capital H in the transliteration below. Another feature from the elder futhark is the use of the ansuz rune (ᚨ) which is here specifically used to symbolize a long nasal a, often transcribed as "á" which is similar but not identical to its Scandinavian descendant "å". The last character in the runic text is damaged, but is clearly a, and represents the first use of this rune for an 'm' in Denmark. The text is arranged in two lines of different sizes. It has been suggested that this may have been done in imitation of Merovingian or Carolingian manuscripts, which have the first line in long slender characters with the following lines in shorter, stubbier text.

The inscription states that Gunnvaldr is a Þulʀ, which signifies some office or rank, perhaps a priest or a skald, compare Old Norse þula meaning "litany." It is related to the later Norse Þulr, a position described as being a wise man or sage associated with Scandinavian chieftains and royalty. The translation offered by the Rundata project suggests reciter. The location Salhaugar in the text has been identified as referring to the modern town Salløv, which was in the vicinity of the original site of the runestone. The literal translation of the Old Norse Salhøgum combines sal "hall" with hörgar "mounds," to form "on the hall mounds," suggesting a place with a room where official meetings took place.

== Inscription ==
ᚴᚢᚾ᛫ᚢᚼᛚᛏᛋ ᛐᚼᛁᚾ ᛋᚢᚾᛅᛦ ᚱᚢᚺᛅᛚᛏᛋ ᛫ ᚦᚢᛚᛅᛦ ᛫ ᚨ ᛋᛅᛚᚺᛅᚢᚴᚢ
kun'uAlts stAin sunaʀ ruHalts {} þulaʀ {} o salHauku(m)
Gunwalds sten, sonaʀ Roalds, {} þulaʀ {} á Salhøgum.
Gunnvaldr's stone, Hróaldr's son, thyle of Salhaugar.

The placename Salhøgar is present-day Salløv, a village near Snoldelev.

== Gallery ==
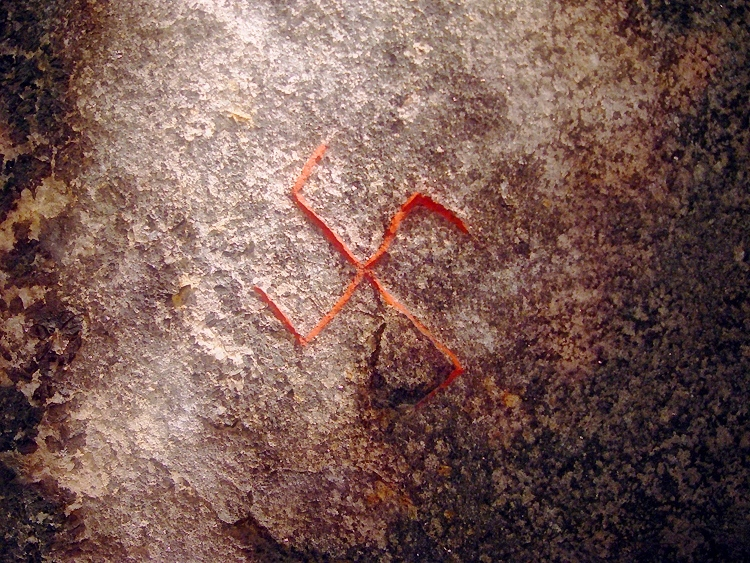
Detail of swastika found on the stone

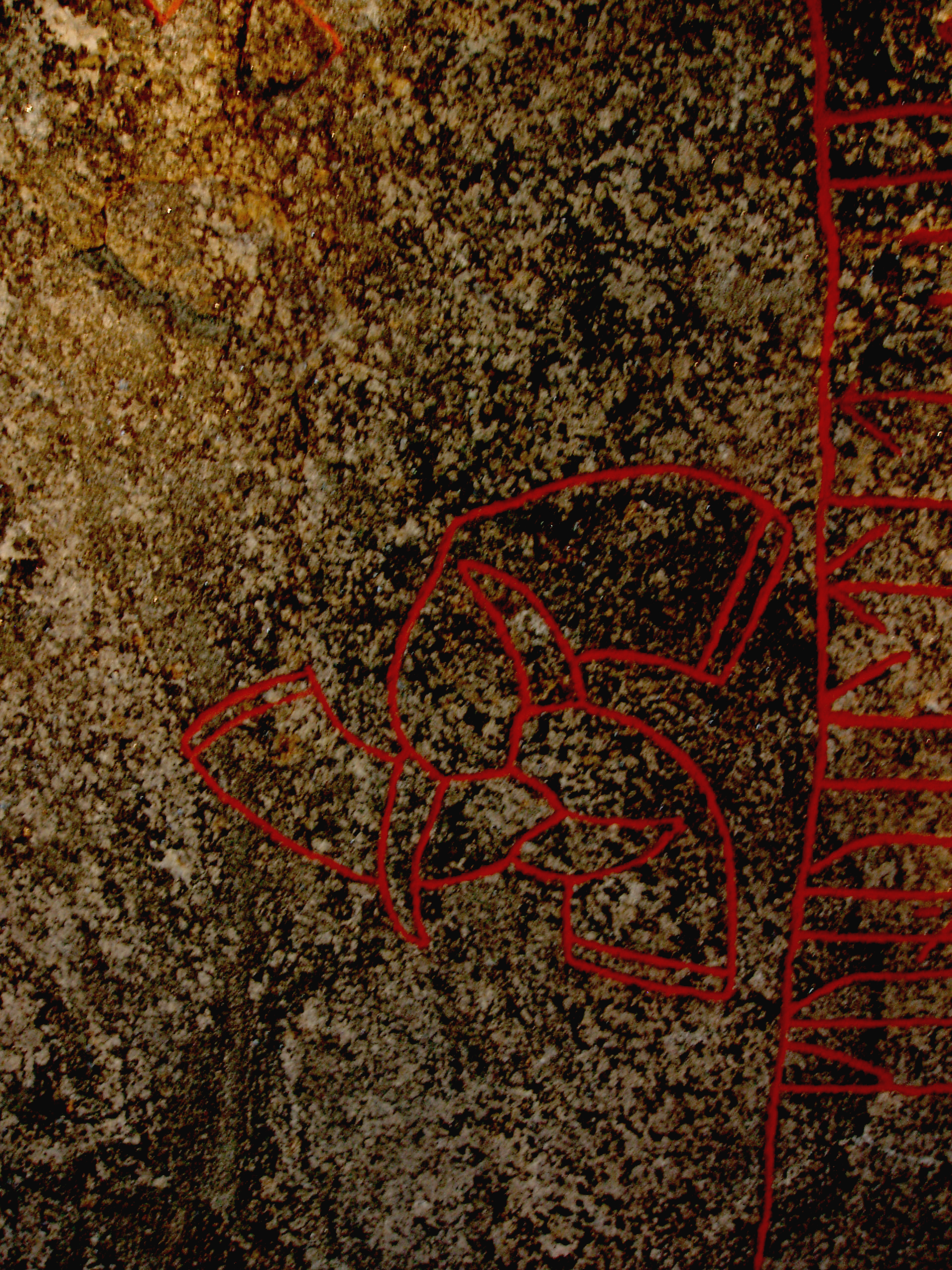
Detail of the interlaced horns

Snoldelev interlaced horns design (illustration)
