= Roskilde Forsyning =

Danish public utility company

- Company type: Private limited company ( A/S)
- Industry: Utilities
- Founded: 2000
- Headquarters: Roskilde, Denmark
- Area served: Greater Roskilde
- Key people: Torben Christiansen (CFO), Asger Kej (Chairman)
- Services: Water supply; Sewage treatment; District heating
- Website: www.roskilde-forsyning.dk

Roskilde Forsyning is a public utility company based in Roskilde, Denmark. It is involved with the supply of drinking water and district heating as well as discharge and treatment of waste water. The current company is the result of a merger in 2000 and is fully owned by Roskilde Municipality. It has approximately 82,000 private and commercial customers.

== History ==
A municipal waterworks was inaugurated in 1880. On 6 December 1905, it was decided to build a local power station which was completed the following year. A wastewater treatment plant was inaugurated near the port in 1936. On 1 November 1963, the Rådmandshaven housing estate is the first buildings in Toskilde to employ distant heating.

Roskilde Forsyning was established through the merger of the activities within electricity, water, district heating in 2000. In 2007, Sewage treatment was also merged with the company while the electricity production was sold to SEAS-NVE on 1 July 2009. The company was converted into an sktieselskab fully owned by Roskilde Municipality in 2010.

== Activities ==
Roskilde Forsyning supplies 10,000 m³ of drinking water per day to its customers using 550 km of water pipes. The water comes from one of its three waterworks: Haraldsborg and Ågerup Waterworks in Roskilde Municipality and Hornsherred Waterworks in Lejre Municipality.

Likewise, Roskilde Forsyning daily removes, treats and disposes 23,100 m³ of wastewater from some 82,000 customers using 200 sewage pumping stations through almost 1000 km of managed sewerage pipes to five sewage treatment works.

Most of the city of Roskilde has been served by district heating since the 1970s. The network of district heating distribution pipes has a total length of 286 km, serving 50,000 customers. Roskilde Fyrsyning purchases the heating from VEKS (Vestegnens Kraft-Varmeselskab). It mainly comes from the Avedøre Power Station in Avedøre and from the Kara/Noveren waste-to-energy plant in Roskilde.
