= Vindinge, Roskilde =

Vindinge
- Town
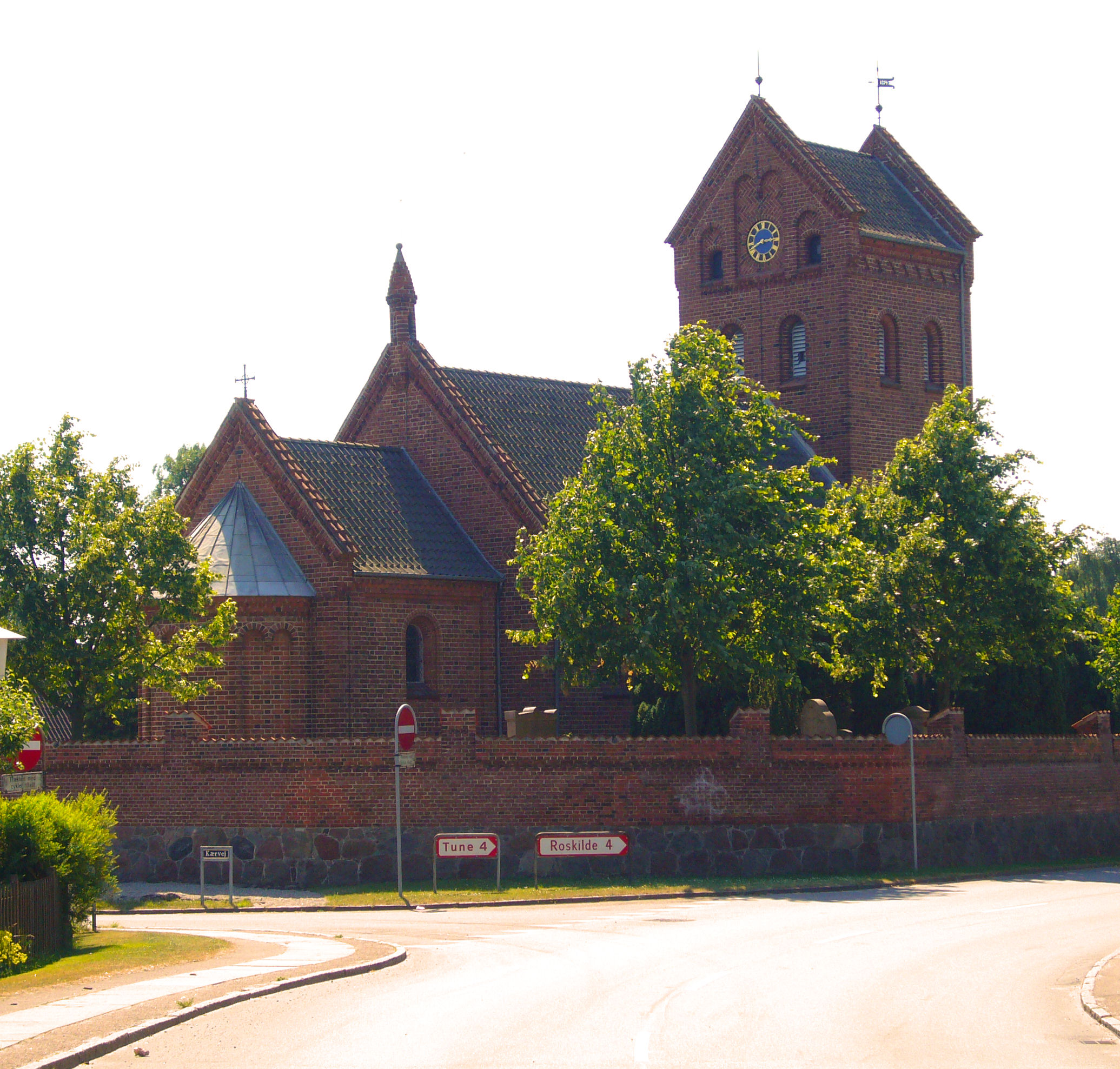
- Vindinge Church

- Location in Denmark Vindinge (Denmark Region Zealand)
- Coordinates: 55°37′23″N 12°8′12″E
- Country: Denmark
- Region: Zealand (Sjælland)
- Municipality: Roskilde

Area
  - Urban: 1.3 km^{2} (0.50 sq mi)

Population (2026)
  - Urban: 3,219
  - Urban density: 2,500/km^{2} (6,400/sq mi)
- Time zone: UTC+1 (CET)
  - Summer (DST): UTC+2 (CEST)

Vindinge is a satellite town located 3 kilometres to the southeast of Roskilde, Denmark. The original village has grown considerably in recent years but it still features a well-preserved village environment with a church, village pond and old farmhouses. The extensive recreational area Hedeland is located immediately to the east of the village. As of 1 January 2026, Vindinge had a population of 3,219.

== History ==
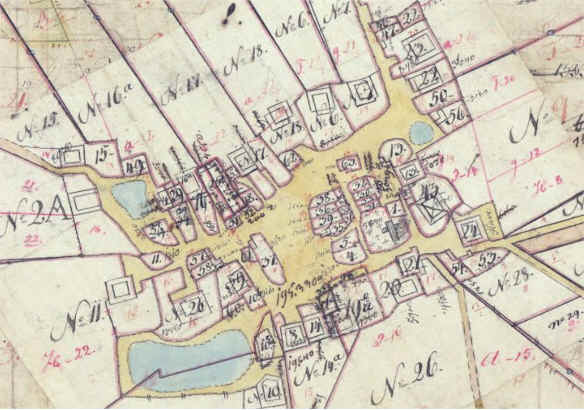
Vindinge in 1805

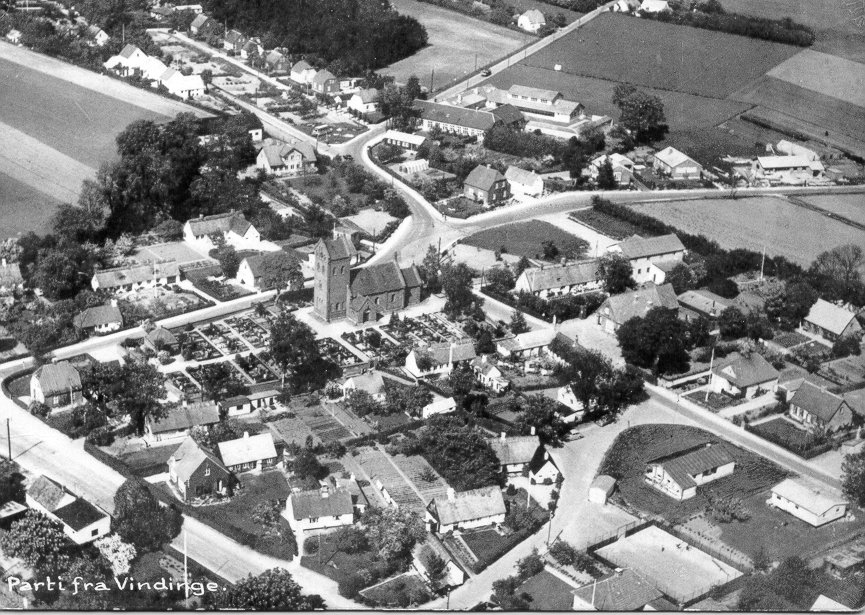
Vindinge in 1c. 1960

Archeological finds show that Vindinge has been inhabited at least since the beginning of the first century. The name was originally Winningawe, "we" (or "Vi") meaning "place of worship". It is believed that Vindinge's role as a place of worship continued up until the Viking era.

With Roskilde's status as an important centre for Catholicism, Vindinge's history became closely associated with the cathedral chapter in Roskilde. The cathedral chapter's census book (Domkapitlets Jordebog) shows that most of the farms were part of the prebends of the canons. The succentor at Roskilde Cathedral owned three farms while Our Lady's Priory owned one.

In 1672 Vindinge consisted of 33 farms. In 1905, it consisted of 25 farms. Redevelopment of some of the surrounding farmland began in about 1970.

== Landmarks ==
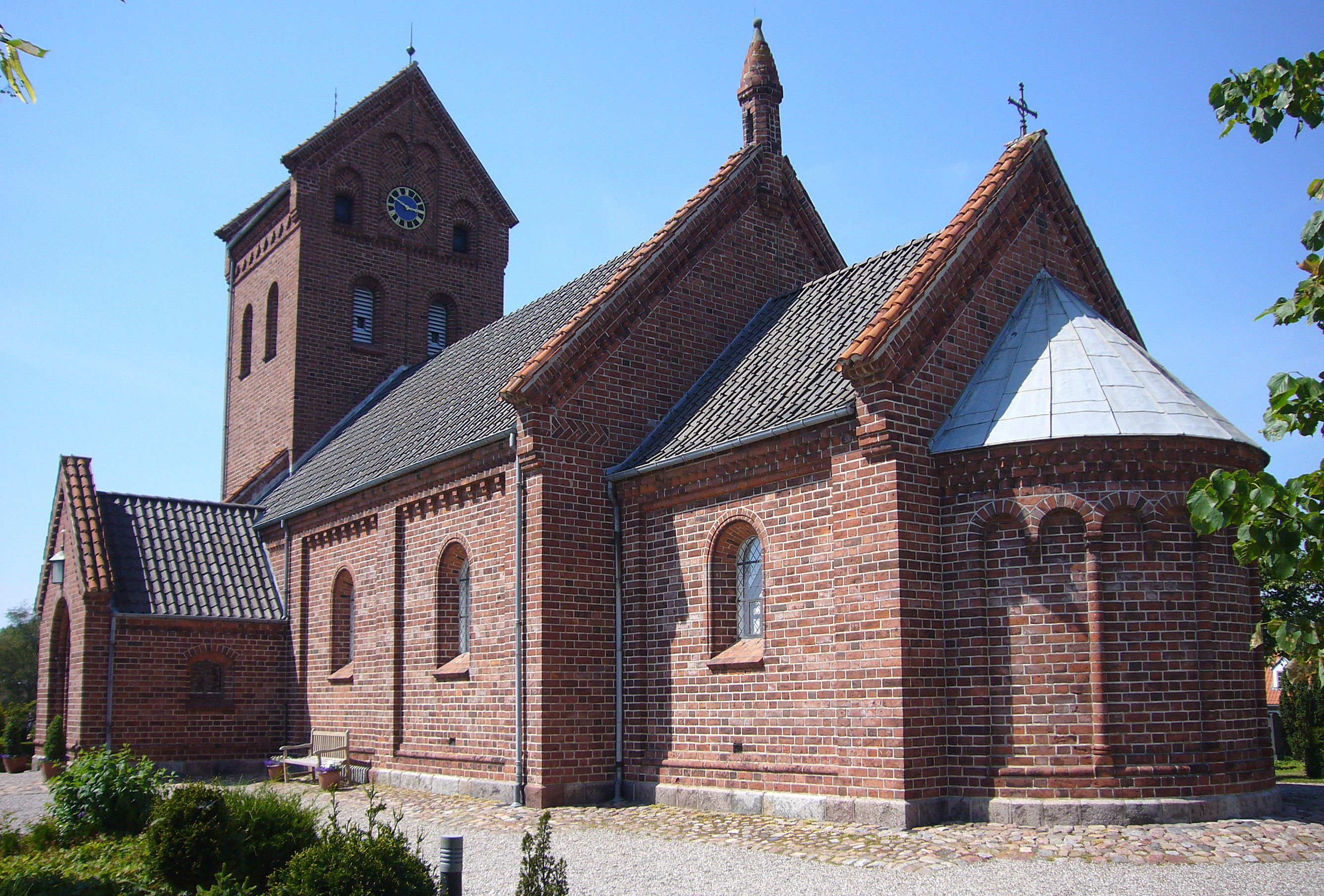
Vindinge Church

Vindinge Church is from 1873 and was designed by Johan Daniel Herholdt. It replaced a Romanesque church which was demolished after falling into disrepair. Another landmark is Vindinge Watertower from 1897. Vindinge is still home to a private waterworks.

== Notable people ==
- Eiler Holck (1627-1696) a Danish military officer and Baron was buried at Vindinge Church.

== Future development ==
In Roskilde Municipality's planning strategy, Vindinge is considered part of "Roskilde South" and designated as a place suitable for further residential development, rather than letting Roskilde proper expanding out in the green belt that partially surround the city. An area at Stålmosen north of Vindinge is currently under redevelopment with single family detached homes,
