= Old Church of Our Lady, Roskilde =

Coordinates: 55°38′19″N 12°04′56″E

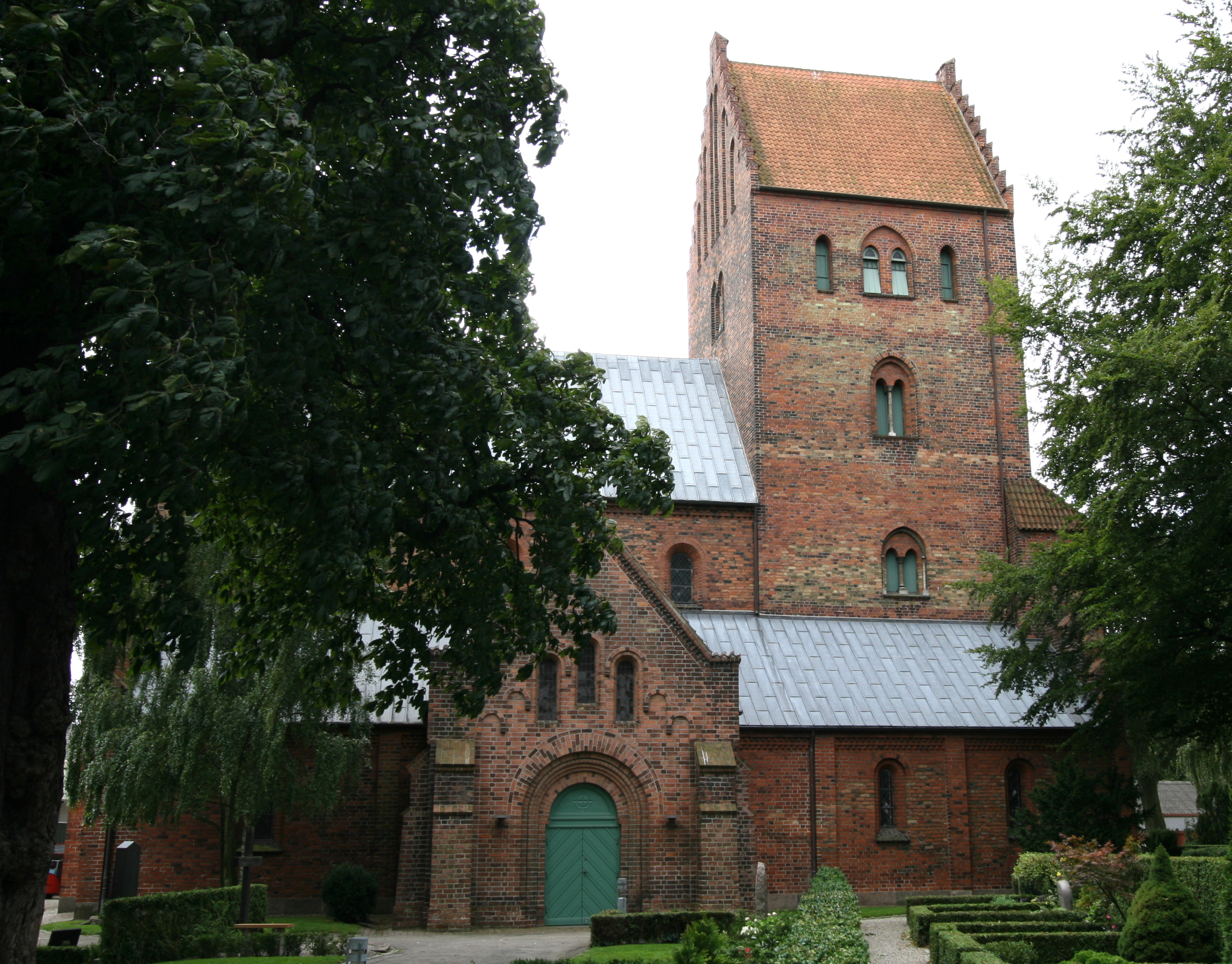
Old Church of Our Lady

The Old Church of Our Lady (Danish: Gammel Vor Frue Kirke) is an 11th-century brick church in Roskilde on the Danish island of Zealand.

== History ==
According to Saxo Grammaticus, the church consecrated to Our Lady was built by Svend Nordmand who was bishop of Roskilde from 1073 to 1088. Around 1160, a convent for Benedictine nuns was established in connection with the church. It was however transferred to the Cistercians in the late 12th century. In 1177, Bishop Absalon allowed the locally acclaimed saint Margrethe af Højelse to be buried in the church. As a result, it was enriched by the many pilgrims who were attracted to visit it. The convent survived the Reformation, still hosting nuns in 1563. The convent was probably demolished in the early 1570s but the church, apart from the choir which was possibly destroyed by fire in 1599, remained intact.

Under Christian III (who reigned until 1559), it became a parish church for Kamstrup, Tjæreby, Skalstrup, Darup and Hastrup. Since 1907 when a new Church of Our Lady was built south of Roskilde, the church has seldom been used for services.

== Description ==
The church is located on the southern fringe of the old town of Roskilde, some 700 m (2,300 ft) from the cathedral. Constructed principally of travertine limestone and medieval brick (munkesten), the church consists of a Romanesque nave and northern aisle and a Late Romanesque extension to the west with a Gothic tower. The church underwent numerous alterations and extensions in the Middle Ages. The south aisle was fully rebuilt in 1887. The Old Church of Our Lady is Zealand's only surviving travertine basilica, that is one with a high central nave opening onto lateral aisles. It present appearance is the result of restoration work in the 1850s.

== Interior ==
The church was originally decorated with frescos, traces of which were discovered in 1865. Today's decoration of the vaults is the work of Jacob Kornerup, based on his interpretation of the earlier frescos. The carved altarpiece from c. 1620, probably the work of Brix Michgell's workshop, is similar to those in Sonnerup and Gadstrup. Similarly, the carved pulpit bearing the date 1623, is the work of the same workshop.

== Churchyard ==
Burials at the church includes:

- Jørgen Beck (1914–1991), actor
- Niels Bernhart (1946–2008), composer, pianist and band leader
- Sofie Holten (1858–1930), painter

== See also ==
- List of churches in Roskilde Municipality
