= Roskilde Abbey =

Former Danish nunnery

Coordinates: 55.6385°N 12.0824°E

Roskilde Abbey or Our Lady's Abbey, Roskilde (Roskilde Kloster or Vor Frue Kloster), was a nunnery dedicated to Saint Mary the Virgin. The abbey was located at Roskilde on the Danish island of Zealand. It was founded in the early 12th century for Benedictine nuns, but in 1177 became part of the Cistercian reform movement. The abbey was suppressed in 1536 during the Protestant Reformation in Denmark. It is now the site the Old Church of Our Lady, Roskilde (Gammel Vor Frue Kirke).

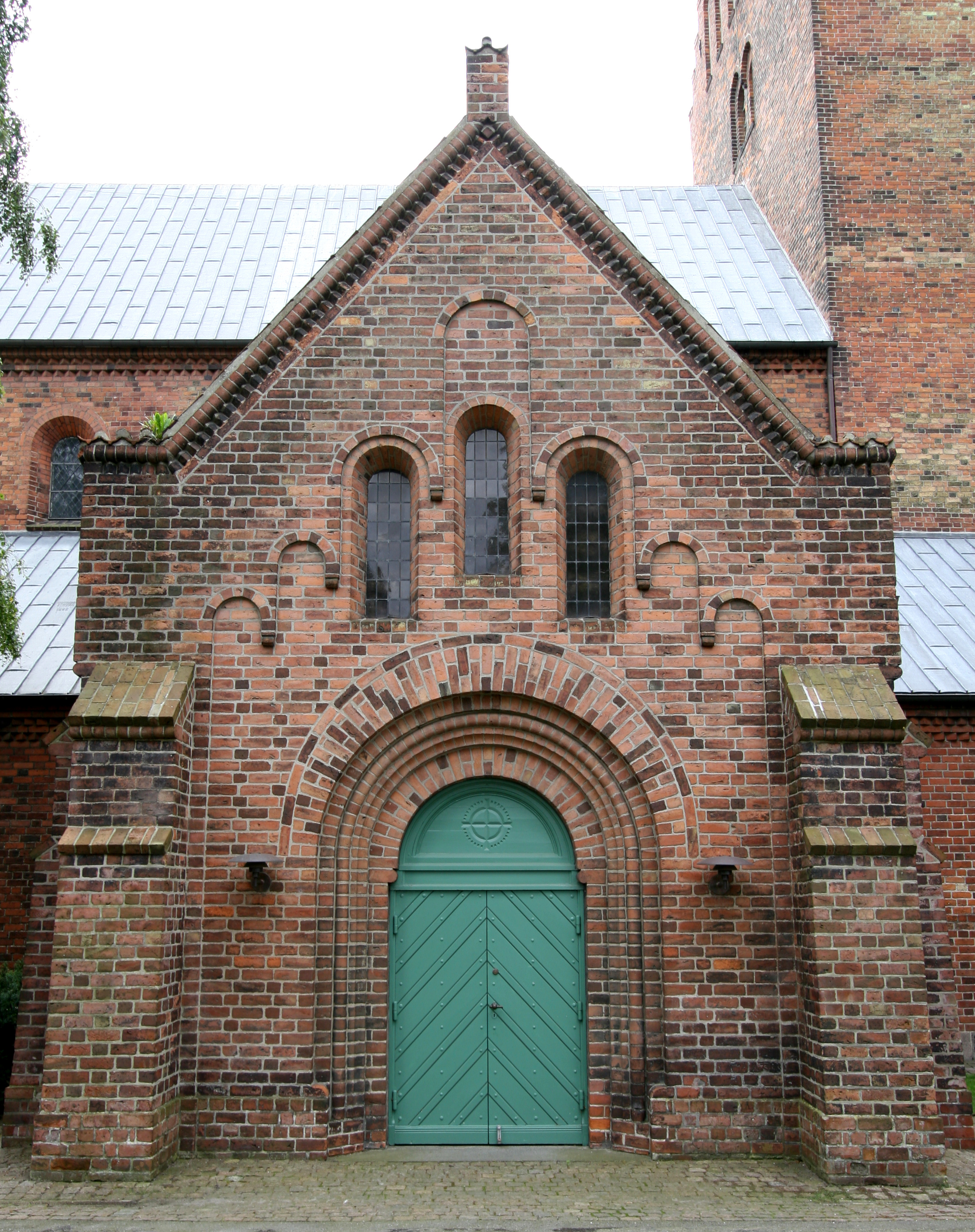
Gammel Vor Frue Kirke, Roskilde

== History ==
Roskilde Abbey was chiefly known for the tomb of Saint Margrethe of Roskilde, also known as Margaret of Ølse or Margaret of Højelse, who died at Ølsemagle or Højelse in 1176. She was married to Herlog in Ølsemagle near Kjøge. Margrethe was murdered by her husband and had been buried as a suicide on the beach at Køge. As a person who committed suicide, she was buried with no religious ceremony.

After miracles were declared to have happened near her grave, her remains were moved to Roskilde Abbey in 1176 by Absalon of Lund, Bishop of Roskilde, a kinsman of Margrethe; he arranged for the construction of a suitable shrine in the church, and transferred the nunnery to the Cistercians in the following year. Despite Absalon's best efforts, and also despite the local veneration, Margrethe was never formally canonised. The shrine was nevertheless later declared a place of pilgrimage by the Pope, and the nuns were allotted one third of the income generated by it. Despite all efforts, however, the center of the cultus remained the small chapel built near Margrethe's original grave on the beach.

== Other sources ==
- Ancient See of Roskilde Centre for Dominican Studies of Dacia
- Den hellige Margareta av Højelse Den katolske kirke
- Diplomatarium OP Roskildensis Centre for Dominican Studies of Dacia
