= Margrethe of Roskilde =

- Died: c. 1176
- Other names: Margrethe of Højelse; Margrethe of Ølsemagle
- Known for: Veneration as a local saint in medieval Denmark
- Spouse: Herlog

Margrethe of Roskilde, also known as Margrethe of Højelse or Margrethe of Ølsemagle (died c. 1176), was a 12th-century Danish woman associated with the Hvide family who was venerated as a saint after her death. According to medieval accounts, she was murdered by her husband, Herlog, who attempted to make her death appear to be suicide. Following reports of miracles at her grave, Bishop Absalon initiated an investigation into her death and had her remains transferred to the Church of Our Lady in Roskilde.

Margrethe was venerated as a local saint during the Middle Ages, but was never formally canonized by the pope. Her precise family relationships are disputed, particularly her identification with Margrete Sunesdatter, daughter of the magnate Sune Ebbesen.

== Life and family ==
Little information about Margrethe's life survives. She is associated with Højelse and Ølsemagle, north of Køge, and with the powerful Danish Hvide family.

The medieval account of the translation of her relics describes her as a relative of Absalon and an even closer relative of Peder Sunesen and his brothers. Peder Sunesen succeeded Absalon as bishop of Roskilde.

=== Identification with Margrete Sunesdatter ===
Margrethe is often identified with Margrete Sunesdatter, daughter of Sune Ebbesen and Cecilie. This identification appears, among other places, in Dansk Kvindebiografisk Leksikon, where the historian Marianne Johansen argues that her relationship to Peder Sunesen suggests that the saint was his sister.

The identification is not universally accepted, however. The historian Hans Olrik pointed out that the genealogical records of Sorø Abbey do not describe Margrete Sunesdatter as a saint and did not consider Margrete Sunesdatter and the murdered saint to be the same woman.

A Lady Margrete was also bequeathed two cups in Absalon's will, dating from around 1201. The will, however, does not identify her as the saint who had previously been murdered, and the identification is uncertain.

=== Marriage and children ===
Margrethe was married to a man named Herlog, also rendered as Herluf or Herlogh. His family and other circumstances are not known with certainty.

They had the following children:

- Sune Herlufsen
- Peder Herlufsen
- Cecilie Herlufsdatter

In addition, Stig Herlufsen has been named as a possible fourth son.

In a hagiographical account written at the French monastery of Clairvaux around 1180, Margrethe is portrayed as a gentle, pious and generous woman. Her husband, by contrast, is described as violent and hostile towards her religious life and charitable deeds.

== Death and initial burial ==
According to the medieval account from Roskilde, Margrethe was murdered on 25 October 1176, the feast day of Saints Crispin and Crispinian. Other sources give 28 October or the year 1177. Dansk Kvindebiografisk Leksikon gives 15 October 1176. The exact date of her death is therefore uncertain.

The Danish hagiographical account relates that Herlog killed his wife and then suspended her body from a beam behind the closed doors of their home, in an attempt to make it appear that she had taken her own life.

In the Middle Ages, people believed to have died by suicide could be denied burial in consecrated ground. Margrethe's parish priest therefore refused to bury her in the churchyard, and she was instead buried in a field near the shore of Køge Bay.

=== The account from Clairvaux ===
Another account of Margrethe's death appears in Liber miraculorum, written by the monk Herbert of Clairvaux between 1178 and 1181. This version places greater emphasis on Margrethe's marriage and the circumstances leading to her death.

It recounts that her husband's sister was jealous of Margrethe and incited her brother to violence against her. The sister is also said to have taken part in the fatal assault. According to the account, after the killing they attempted to make the death appear to be suicide, while Herlog pretended to mourn his wife.

The French account adds that Margrethe was buried between two criminals. These details belong to the medieval hagiographical narrative and cannot all be independently corroborated.

== Miracles and reburial ==
=== Lights at the grave ===
According to the account from Roskilde, unusual lights began appearing at Margrethe's grave after her burial. Light or fire was said to descend from heaven at night above the burial site. Believers interpreted these events as signs that Margrethe was innocent and had died unjustly.

The reports reached Bishop Absalon in Roskilde. According to the account, he first sent trusted men to investigate the events. He then consulted several churchmen, including Simon, abbot of Sorø, and Rikard, a former abbot of Ringsted.

=== Healings ===
The account from Clairvaux also tells of a blind man who reportedly regained his sight at Margrethe's grave. He is portrayed as someone who, after living in darkness, could suddenly see the light.

The two hagiographical accounts also mention further miracles, although few are described in detail. The older chronicle of Zealand even laments that more of Margrethe's miracles were not recorded.

=== Absalon's investigation ===
According to the Roskilde account, Absalon summoned Herlog and questioned him about the death. Herlog eventually confessed to killing Margrethe.

The account states that Margrethe's relatives wanted revenge, but Absalon prevented a blood feud and instead arranged a settlement between the parties. Herlog was ordered to pay financial compensation.

=== The solemn reburial ===
Margrethe's remains were subsequently exhumed and taken to the Church of Our Lady in Roskilde. The account describes a large religious procession in which clergy and the bishop accompanied her body while psalms were sung. Burning candles were carried ahead of the bier, and people from different social groups took part in the procession.

Margrethe was buried again in Roskilde, and a substantial tomb monument was erected over her. According to the hagiographical account, miracles continued at her new grave.

In the calendar of the Psalter of the sons of Sune, 19 July 1177 is recorded as the date on which her remains were translated.

== Veneration and legacy ==
After the reburial, Margrethe's grave at the Church of Our Lady became a local place of pilgrimage. She was venerated as a saint without ever having been formally canonized by the pope.

Attempts were made during the 13th century to obtain papal canonization, but these did not result in formal recognition. Nevertheless, several papal documents refer to her as holy.

=== The grave in Roskilde and the chapel by the sea ===
Margrethe's cult was associated with two locations: her grave in the Church of Our Lady in Roskilde and her original burial place at Køge Bay.

A chapel was built near the original grave by the sea, where pilgrims brought offerings. The chapel existed during the Middle Ages but has since disappeared.

In 1985, remains of a medieval brick building were found near the boundary between Højelse and Ølsemagle parishes. The remains have been associated with the lost chapel of St Margrethe, but the identification of the building is not certain.

=== Papal letters and economic significance ===
Margrethe's cult also acquired economic importance. Absalon transferred to Sorø Abbey one-third of certain offerings made at her grave. This right was confirmed by Pope Lucius III in a privilege dated 25 January 1182.

A privilege issued by Pope Innocent III on 23 November 1198 likewise confirmed Sorø Abbey's income from the memorial site of Saint Margrethe in Roskilde.

Two letters from Pope Alexander IV in 1257 concern ecclesiastical rights connected to her cult. The letter of 16 July refers to offerings at Margrethe's grave near the sea, while the letter of 13 August mentions both income from collections for Saint Margrethe and her church by the sea.

The Convent of Our Lady also had the right to collect so-called Margretepenge (Margrethe's money) in twelve districts of eastern Zealand.

=== Relics in Scania ===
Margrethe's cult also became known outside Zealand. In 1191, relics attributed to her were placed in the altar of Gumlösa Church in Scania. By this time, her relative Absalon had become Archbishop of Lund.

Her reliquary remained in the Church of Our Lady in Roskilde until the Reformation in Denmark. Her remains subsequently disappeared, and the precise location of her grave is no longer known.

== Historical sources ==
The principal narrative sources for Margrethe's life and death are two Latin accounts from the late 12th century, which differ in both content and purpose.

=== The Roskilde account ===
Relatio de translatione S. Margaretæ Roskildensis is a short account of the murder, the discovery of the crime, and Margrethe's reburial. The text was probably written in Roskilde during the 1190s or the early 1200s, although its precise date remains disputed.

The account places particular emphasis on Absalon's role in uncovering the murder and arranging for Margrethe to be reburied in Roskilde.

=== The Clairvaux account ===
Another account appears in Herbert's Liber miraculorum, written at the French monastery of Clairvaux between 1178 and 1181. It was probably based on information brought to the monastery by Archbishop Eskil of Lund.

In this text, Margrethe's character and marriage are more prominent than in the Roskilde account. The narrative of her husband's sister, the violent marriage, and the blind man appears here.

== The so-called Margaretas särk ==
A medieval linen garment known as Margaretas särk is preserved in the Cathedral Museum at Lund University's Historical Museum. It has been associated with traditions of helping women during difficult childbirths. The museum describes it as a liturgical clerical garment, a surplice (superpellicium), and mentions a tradition associating it with the union queen Margaret I of Denmark.

In a letter dated 23 November 1468, King Christian I of Denmark asked the cathedral chapter of Lund to lend him a garment that tradition held to be helpful to women during childbirth. The letter does not, however, name any woman called Margrethe.

In the 18th century, the historian Sven Lagerbring suggested that the garment might have been connected with Saint Margrethe of Roskilde. The possibility was subsequently repeated by other historians. Helge Søgaard, however, pointed out that no such identification appears in Christian I's letter.

The museum has dated the surviving garment to the late 15th century. A radiocarbon date published by Margareta Nockert and Göran Possnert in 2002 and cited by Emma Malmqvist instead indicates a period between 1320 and 1415. Both datings place the surviving garment considerably later than Margrethe of Roskilde's lifetime.

There is thus no evidence that the surviving garment personally belonged to the saint. It is possible, however, that it became associated with her cult at a later date. The garment has also been linked to the Virgin Mary and Saint Margaret of Antioch.

== See also ==
- Hvide
- Hvide family estates
- Absalon
