= Svogerslev =

- Town
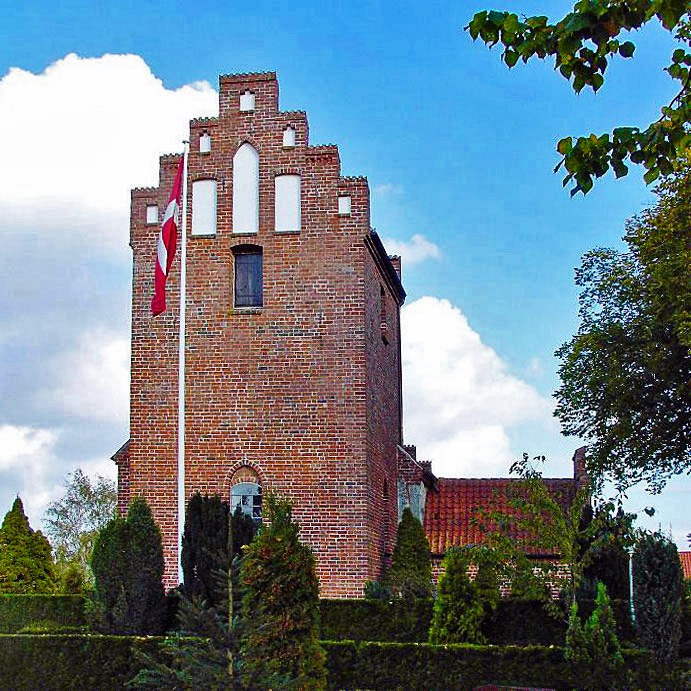
- Svogerslev Church

- Location in Denmark Svogerslev (Denmark Region Zealand)
- Coordinates: 55°38′3″N 12°0′49″E
- Country: Denmark
- Region: Zealand (Sjælland)
- Municipality: Roskilde

Area
  - Urban: 2 km^{2} (0.77 sq mi)

Population (2026)
  - Urban: 4,316
  - Urban density: 2,200/km^{2} (5,600/sq mi)
  - Gender: 2,034 males and 2,282 females
- Time zone: UTC+1 (CET)
  - Summer (DST): UTC+2 (CEST)
- Postal code: DK-4000 Roskilde

Svogerslev is a small satellite town located four kilometres west of Roskilde, Denmark. The original village features a village pond, a Romanesque church, one of the smallest in Denmark, and a number of old farm buildings. The historic centre is surrounded by large developments of single family detached homes. As of 1 January 2026, it had a population of 4,316.

== History ==
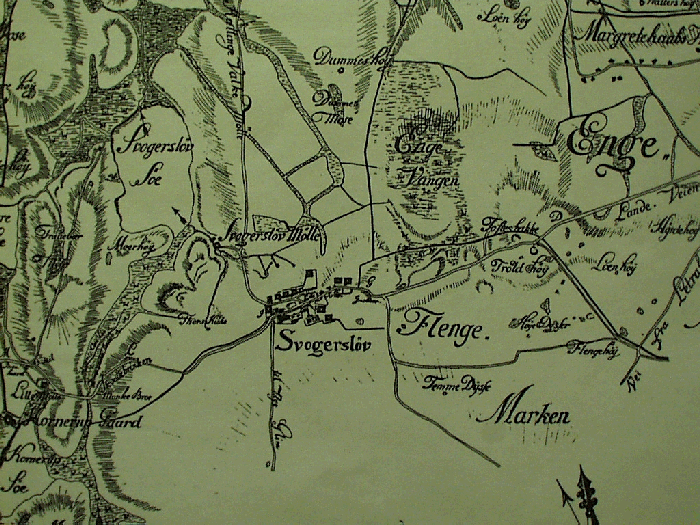
The village of Svogerslev seen on an old map

The name Svogerslev is mentioned in 1257 as Suauerslef, derived from the old male name Swawar and the suffix -lev. Svogerslev Inn opened sometime during the 17th century. In 1727, it became a royal privileged coaching inn. The mail coach paused there to change horses on its way from Roskilde to Hornsherred. The inn was owned by the counts of Ledreborg. Count Holsteinborg closed the inn in 1808.

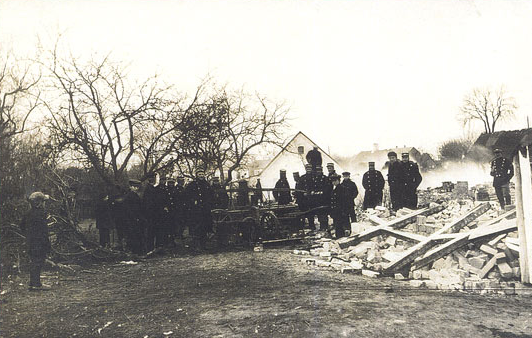
Toftegården after The Fire

On October 31st, 1914, a massive fire started in Toftegården. It quickly spread throughout the city and burned nine houses to the ground. Due to soldiers being stationed near the city, they came to help put out the fires. A local blacksmith's shop caught fire multiple times, but each time it was saved.

"Brand i Svogerslev" (in Danish). Svogerslev Lokalhistorie.

In the 1970s, Svogerslev was expanded with large areas of single family detached homes.

== Today ==
Svogerslev Church dates from the 12th century. The Romanesque nave was expanded with chancel, tower and porch in the Gothic style in about 1450. The church is one of the smallest in Denmark, seating just 60 people. Svogerslev Inn occupies a set of thatched buildings dating to the late 1600s. It reopened in the 1950s but closed again in July 2020.

The town also has a school with approximately 530 students.

The town has a Netto supermarket, a petrol station and a small shopping centre with a Meny, a bakery, a bar and a hairdresser. A small industrial area is located in the southeastern outskirts.

== Surroundings ==
Svogerslev Lake (Lynghøjsøerne) is located to the southwest of the village. There are also several other smaller lakes in the area.

== Notable people ==
- Martin Ågerup (born 1966), economist and president of CEPOS, lives in Svogerslev
