= Gadstrup =

- Town
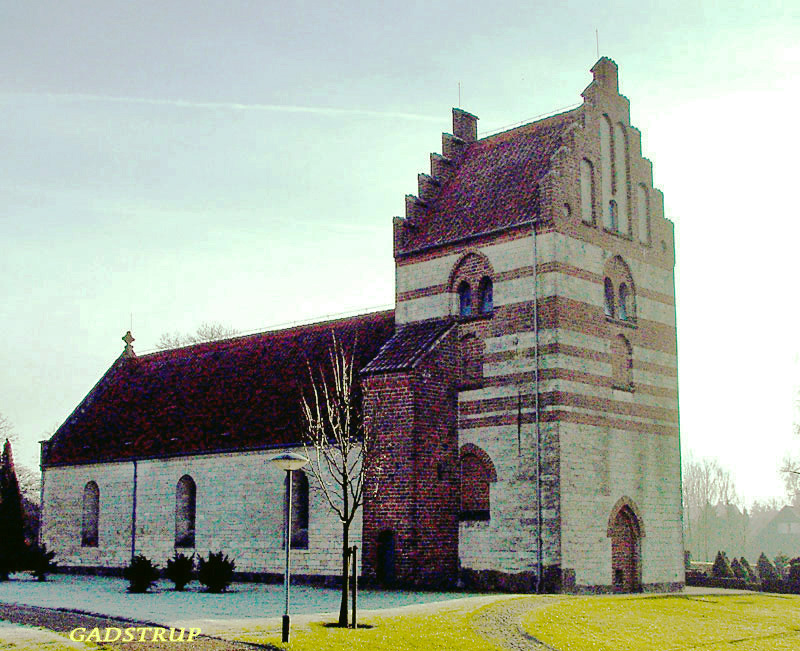
- Gadstrup Church

- Location in Denmark Gadstrup (Denmark Region Zealand)
- Coordinates: 55°34′25″N 12°5′46″E
- Country: Denmark
- Region: Zealand (Sjælland)
- Municipality: Roskilde

Area
  - Urban: 1.7 km^{2} (0.66 sq mi)

Population (2026)
  - Urban: 2,019
  - Urban density: 1,200/km^{2} (3,100/sq mi)
- Time zone: UTC+1 (CET)
  - Summer (DST): UTC+2 (CEST)
- Postal code: DK-4621 Gadstrup

Gadstrup is a railway town located on the Lille Syd railway between Roskilde and Køge, in Roskilde Municipality, some 20 km southwest of Copenhagen, Denmark.

== History ==
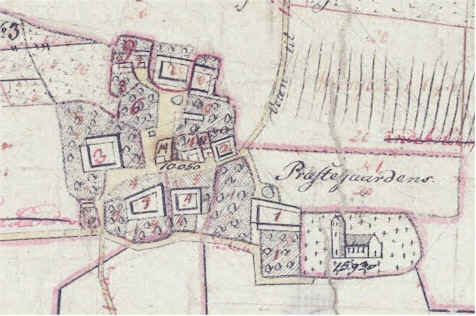
Gadstrup in 1808

The name Gadstrup is first documented in 1176 as Gadstorp (1257 Garsthorp). In 1568, prebend of Gadstrup, one of the six prebends associated with the cathedral chapter in Roskilde, owned six farms in Gadstrup as well as three in Ramsølille and one in Viby. Our Lady's Abbey also owned property in the village at this point. In 1682, Gadstrup consisted of 6 farms and one house. In 1808, it consisted of seven farms but in 1838 only of four farms, probably because some of the farms had moved out of the village.

Gadstrup station opened on the 4. October 1870, serving the new Zealand South Line between Copenhagen and the ferries to Falster by way of Køge and Næstved. This led to the development of a new district located on fields which previously belonged to the village Salløv in the neighbouring parish of Snoldelev. In 1924, with the opening of the Ringsted–Næstved leg of the current South Line, Gadstrup station was reduced to a station of local importance on the Little South Line between Roskilde and Næstved.

== Landmarks ==
Gadstrup Church was built in about year 1100. Only the nave survives from the original limestone church. The tower is from about 1400. The Romanesque chancel was replaced by the current Gothic one in about 1500 when the nave was extended to the east.

Ramsø Hallen is the local sports venue. Gadstrup School is the local primary school.

== Business park ==
Gadstrup Business Park (Gadstrup Ethvervspark) is located north of the town. Companies in Gadstrup includes the DLG timber company, JMW-elteknik and the construction firms A. & B. Andersen and PI Entreprenørfirma. In January 2014, DSV purchased an 80,000 square metres site with the intention of building a 40,000 sqm logistics terminal on the land. Copenhagen Airport Roskilde is located immediately to the east of the town.

== Surrounding ==
The Gadstrup area comprises the villages Snoldelev, Vor Frue, Darup, Kamstrup, Tjæreby, Skalstrup, Brordrup, Hastrup and Salløv.

The protected natural area Ramsødalen continues west for six kilometres to the town of Øm in Lejre Municipality. A hiking trail runs through the area. Two observation towers are located along the route, one of them at Ramsømagle Lake.

== Notable people ==
- Emil Vinjebo (born 1994 in Gadstrup) a Danish cyclist
