= Ramsø =

Danish commune

Coordinates: 55.5488°N 12.02617°E

Ramsø was a municipality (Danish kommune) in the former Roskilde County on the island of Zealand (Sjælland) in east Denmark until 1 January 2007. The municipality covered an area of 76 km^{2} (29 sq mi) and had a total population in 2005 of 9,320. Its last mayor was Poul Lindor Nielsen, a member of the Social Democrats (Socialdemokraterne) political party. The main town and the site of its municipal council was Viby. Other towns and villages in the municipality were Gadstrup, Skalstrup, Snoldelev and Ørsted.

The municipality was created in 1970 due to a kommunalreform ("municipality reform") that combined existing parishes:

- Dåstrup Parish
- Gadstrup Parish
- Snoldelev Parish
- Syv Parish
- Ørsted Parish

Ramsø municipality ceased to exist as the result of the Kommunalreformen ("Municipality Reform") of 2007. It was merged with the existing Gundsø and Roskilde municipalities to form the new Roskilde Municipality, with an area of 212 km^{2} (82 sq mi) and a total population in 2015 of 79,441. The new municipality belongs to Region Sjælland ("Zealand Region").

== See also ==
- Snoldelev Stone
