= Joy Mogensen =

Danish politician

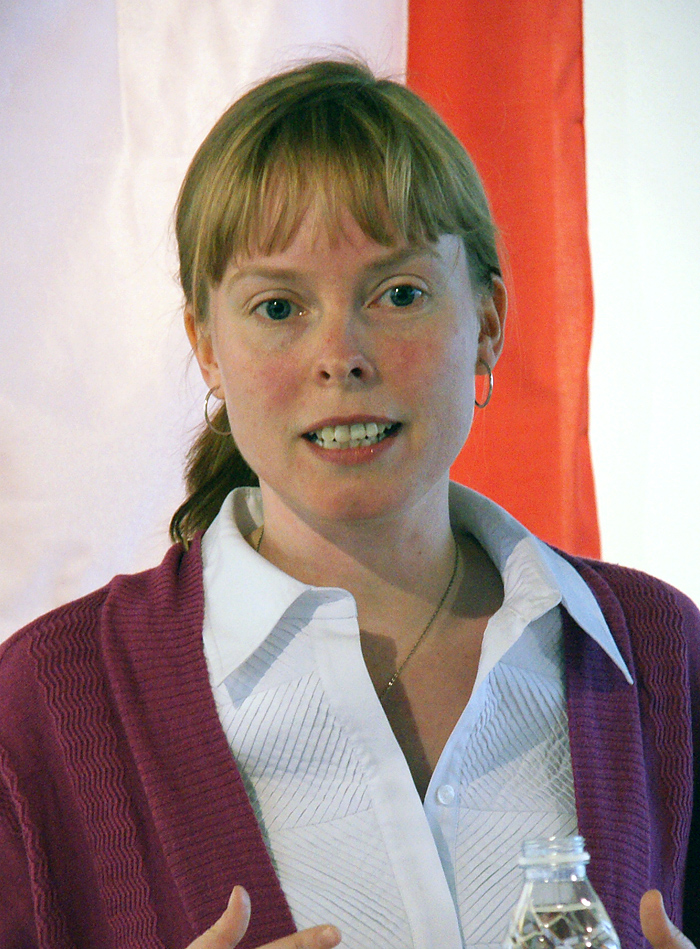

Minister for Culture and Church
- In office 27 June 2019 – 16 August 2021
- Prime Minister: Mette Frederiksen
- Preceded by: Mette Bock
- Succeeded by: Ane Halsboe-Jørgensen

Personal details
- Born: 11 August 1980 (age 45) Toronto, Ontario, Canada
- Party: Social Democrats

Joy Mogensen (born 11 August 1980) is a notable Danish social democratic politician who served as Minister of Culture and Church from 2019 to 2021.

She was born in Toronto, Ontario, Canada, and is educated at Roskilde University. She served as mayor of Roskilde Municipality from 2011 to 2019. Subsequently, she was appointed as the Minister for Culture and Church in the Frederiksen Cabinet from 27 June 2019. In August 2021, she stepped down as minister.
