= Gundsømagle =

- Town
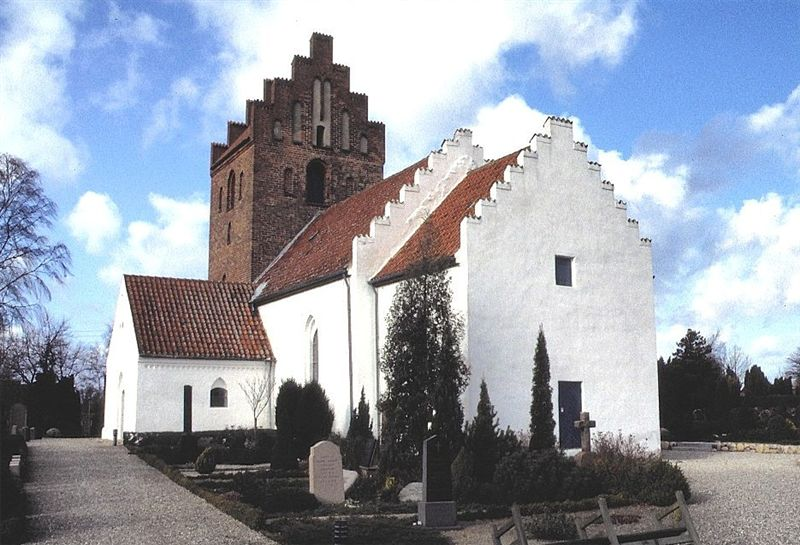
- Gundsømagle Church

- Location in Denmark Gundsømagle (Denmark Region Zealand)
- Coordinates: 55°44′7″N 12°8′53″E
- Country: Denmark
- Region: Zealand (Sjælland)
- Municipality: Roskilde

Area
  - Urban: 1.21 km^{2} (0.47 sq mi)

Population (2026)
  - Urban: 2,877
  - Urban density: 2,380/km^{2} (6,160/sq mi)
- Time zone: UTC+1 (CET)
  - Summer (DST): UTC+2 (CEST)

Gundsømagle is a town located two kilometres east of Jyllinge and Roskilde Fjord in the northern part of Roskilde Municipality, approximately 40 kilometres west of Copenhagen, Denmark.

== History ==
Gundsømagle is mentioned (as Guthensø; 1376 "Gundesiø maklæ") in a letter from Bishop Absalon where he grants the village to Æbelholt Abbey, which was founded on the small island of Eskilsø in Roskilde Fjord. At this point, it consisted of four farms. When the monastery moved to its new home in North Zealand, it kept some of its old holdings. The largest farm in the village, Gundsøgård, came under the Bidstrup estate of Roskilde in 1300. It was confiscated by the Crown in connection with the Reformation and the land was sold off in lots to private buyers in 1670. In 1792, Gundsømagle consisted of 34 farms.

The village began to grow in the 1960s and was selected as seat of the new Gundsø Municipality which was created in 1970 from a portion of Sømme herred,

== Landmarks ==
Gundsømagle Church dates from about 1100. The interior is decorated with murals. Hejnstrupgård is from 1780 and was listed in 1959.

== Surroundings ==
The surroundings of Gundsømagle are known for their many dolmens and small lakes.
