= Roskilde Municipality =

Roskilde Municipality Roskilde Kommune (Danish)
- Municipality
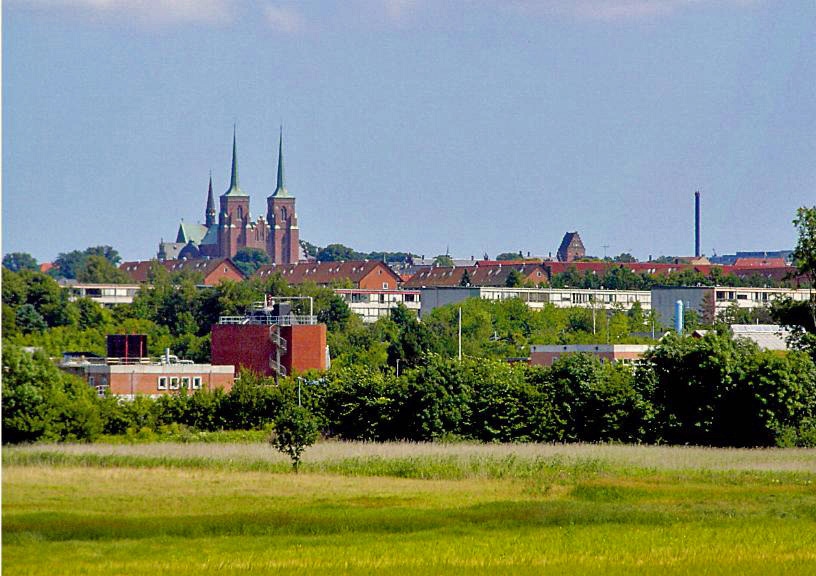

- Coat of arms

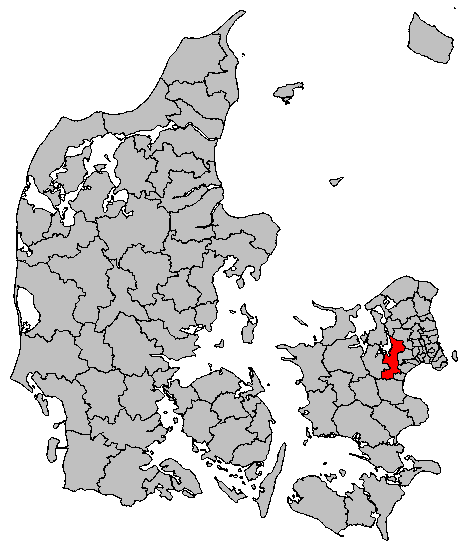
- Coordinates: 55°39′N 12°06′E
- Country: Denmark
- Region: Zealand
- Established: 1 January 2007
- Seat: Roskilde

Government
  - Mayor: Tomas Breddam (S)

Area
  - Total: 211.88 km^{2} (81.81 sq mi)

Population (1 January 2026)
  - Total: 92,697
  - Density: 437.50/km^{2} (1,133.1/sq mi)
- Time zone: UTC+1 (CET)
  - Summer (DST): UTC+2 (CEST)
- Postal code: 4000
- Municipal code: 265
- Website: roskilde.dk

Roskilde Municipality (Danish: Roskilde Kommune) is a kommune in the Region Sjælland, 30 km west of Copenhagen on the island of Zealand in east Denmark.

The biggest city is Roskilde, the municipality covers an area of 212 km^{2}, and it has a total population of 92,697 (2026). Its current mayor is Tomas Breddam. He is a member of Socialdemokraterne.

Neighboring municipalities are Egedal to the northeast, Greve and Solrød to the southeast, Høje-Taastrup to the east, Køge to the south and Lejre to the west. To the north-west is Roskilde Fjord.

Roskilde University is located in the municipality.

By 1 January 2007 the former Roskilde municipality was merged with Gundsø and Ramsø municipalities into the current one, as the result of Kommunalreformen ("The Municipal Reform" of 2007). The name of the new municipality is still "Roskilde Kommune". The town hall is situated in the city of Roskilde, at Køgevej 80. It is the former county hall of Roskilde County.

== Urban areas ==
The ten largest urban areas in the municipality are:

#	Locality	Population
1	Roskilde	53,897
2	Jyllinge	10,920
3	Viby	5,227
4	Svogerslev	4,316
5	Vindinge	3,219
6	Gundsømagle	2,877
7	Gadstrup	2,019
8	Ågerup	1,764
9	Veddelev	1,141
10	Vor Frue	708

== Economy ==
Companies with headquarters in Roskilde municipality

- DLF
- Argo
- Top-Toy A/S (Danish Division of MGA Entertainment)
- CRH Concrete (Danish division of CRH plc)
- Bankernes EDB Central
- Stryhn's
- Roskilde Forsyning
- DanÆg

== Politics ==
=== Municipal council ===
Roskilde's municipal council consists of 31 members, elected every four years.

Below are the municipal councils elected since the Municipal Reform of 2007.

Election	Party										Total seats	Turnout	Elected mayor
Election	A	B	C	D	F	I	O	V	Ø	Others	Total seats	Turnout	Elected mayor
2005	11	1	2		4		2	10	1		31	71.8%	Poul Lindor Nielsen (A)
2009	10	1	3		7		2	7	1		31	67.7%	Poul Lindor Nielsen (A)
2013	13	1	1		1		3	9	3		31	73.7%	Joy Mogensen (A)
2017	16	1	2		1		3	6	2		31	69.97%	Joy Mogensen (A)
2021	9	2	5	1	3	1	2	5	3		31	72.8%	Tomas Breddam (S)
2025	7	1	7		5	2	2	3	3	1	31	74.1%	Tomas Breddam (S)
Data from Kmdvalg.dk 2005, 2009, 2013, 2017, valg.dk 2021 and 2025

== Government ==
Accident Investigation Board Denmark is headquartered in Roskilde in Roskilde Municipality.
