= Jyllinge =

- Town
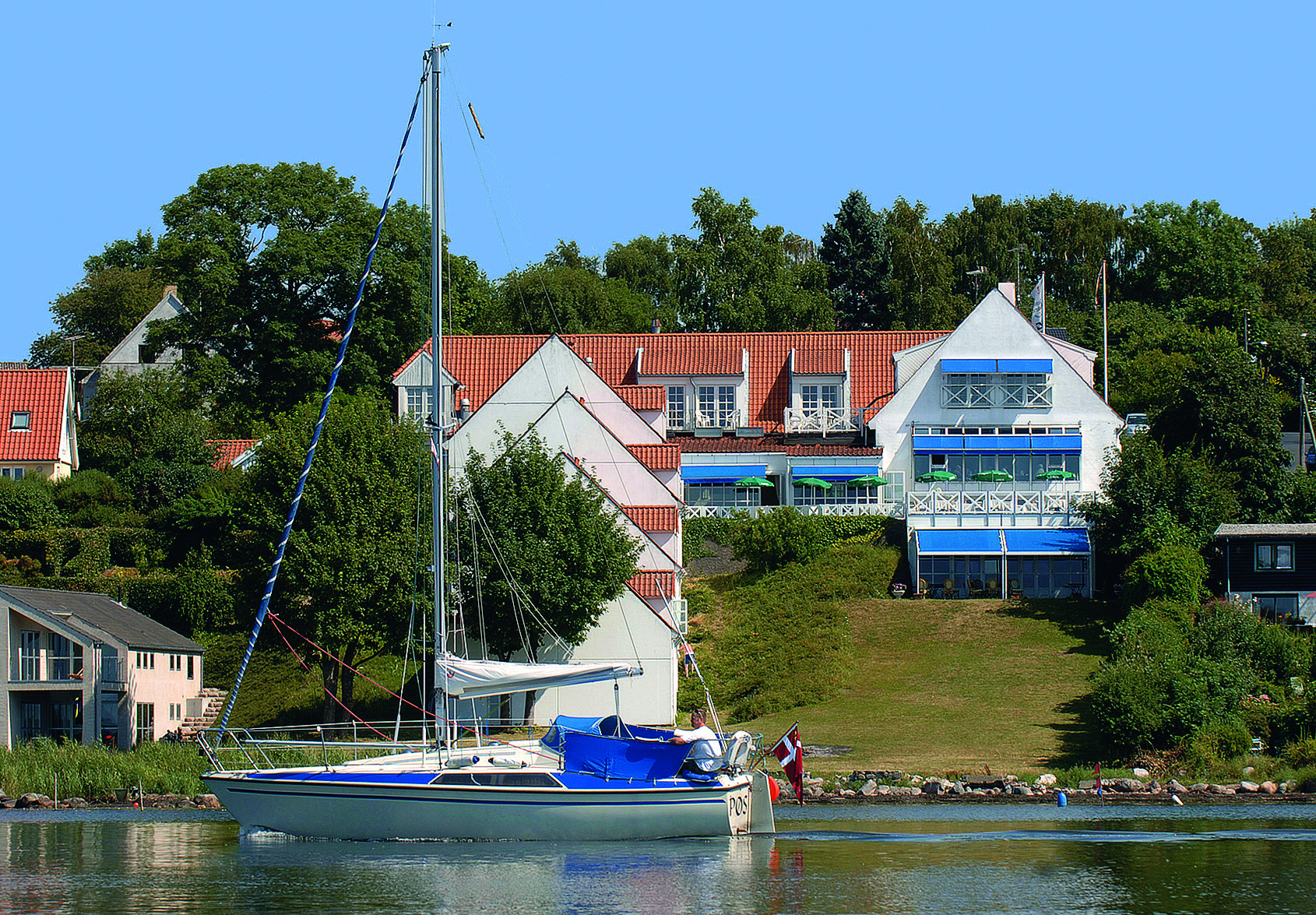
- Hotel Søfryd in Old Jyllinge

- Location within Denmark Location within Denmark Region Zealand
- Coordinates: 55°45′04″N 12°06′23″E
- Country: Denmark
- Region: Zealand
- Municipality: Roskilde

Area
  - Urban: 5.8 km^{2} (2.2 sq mi)
- Elevation: 24 m (79 ft)

Population (2026)
  - Urban: 10,920
  - Urban density: 1,900/km^{2} (4,900/sq mi)
  - Gender: 5,392 males and 5,528 females
- Time zone: UTC+1 (GMT)
- Postal code: 4040 Jyllinge

Jyllinge is a town located on the eastern shores of Roskilde Fjord, midway between Roskilde and Frederikssund in Roskilde Municipality, some 40 km west of Copenhagen, Denmark. The original fishing village is surrounded by large areas of Single-family detached homes. As of 1 January 2026, it had a population of 10,920.

== History ==
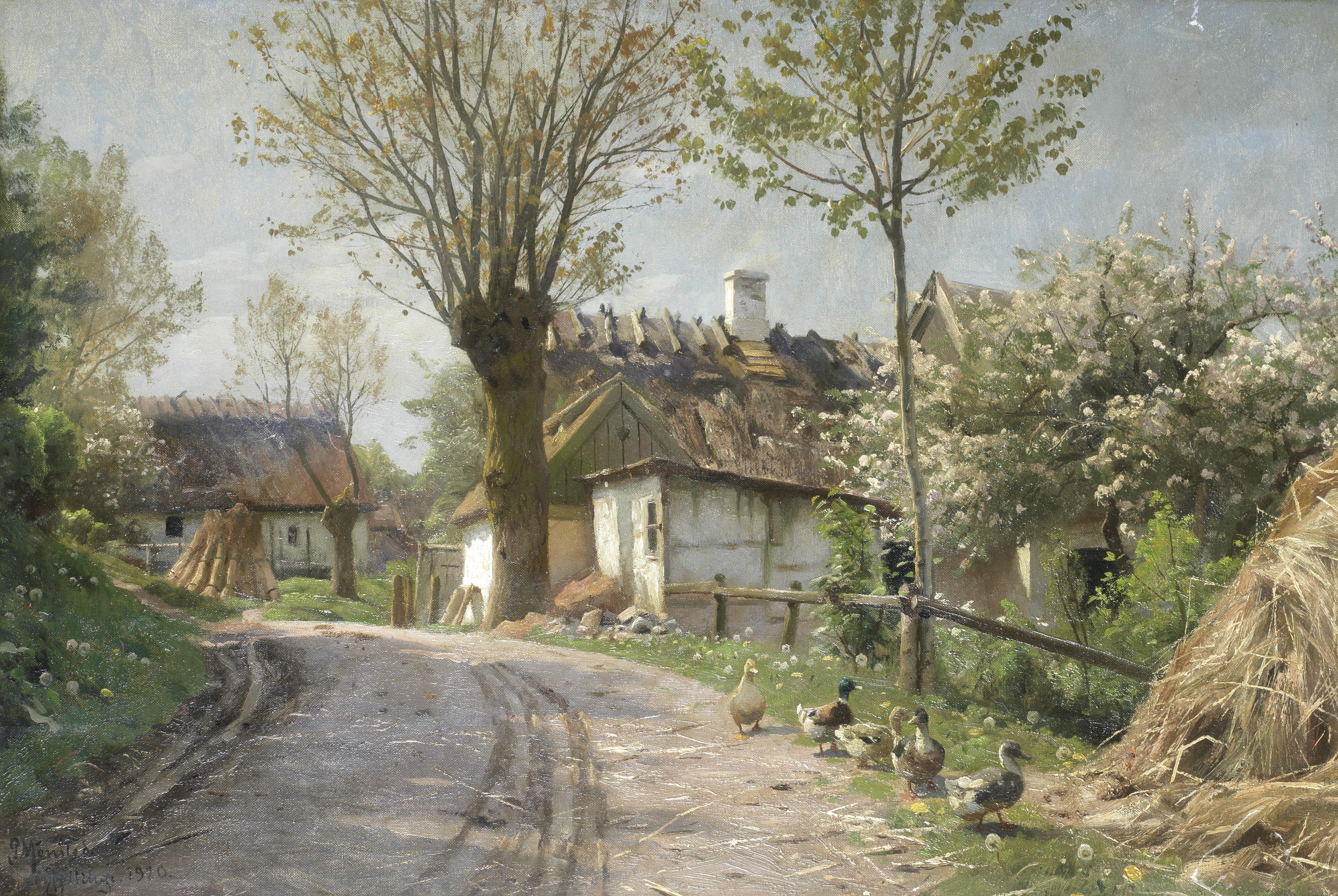
Jyllinge in 1920, painting by Peder Mørk Mønsted

Jyllinge is first mentioned in 1171 as Iuleghe, possibly derived from Iula, meaning "the yellow', an old name for Lilleø, and from Old Danish eki, meaning "oak forest".

The village consisted of a mixture of fishermen and farmers. The fishing took place from small boats on the fiord and was mainly for eel. In 1861, the village had 28 fishermen and 21 boats. The first primitive harbor was constructed in 1870. It saw a modest expansion in 1906 and a boatyard opened in 1909. In 1926, a group of fishermen founded Jyllinge Fish Exports. A new harbor was constructed between 1956 and 1969.

The town has experienced considerable growth after World War II, prospering from its location near Roskilde and Copenhagen.

== Harbour ==
Only a single commercial fishing vessel continues to operate out of Jyllinge Harbour. A marina with room for 400 leisure crafts has been constructed to the south of the harbor. A smaller. privately owned marina is located on its north side.

== Churches ==
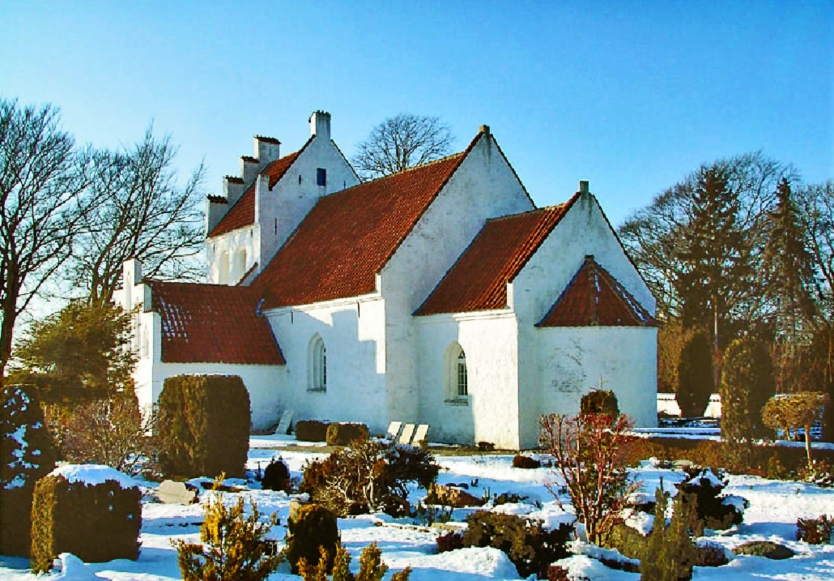
Jyllinge Church

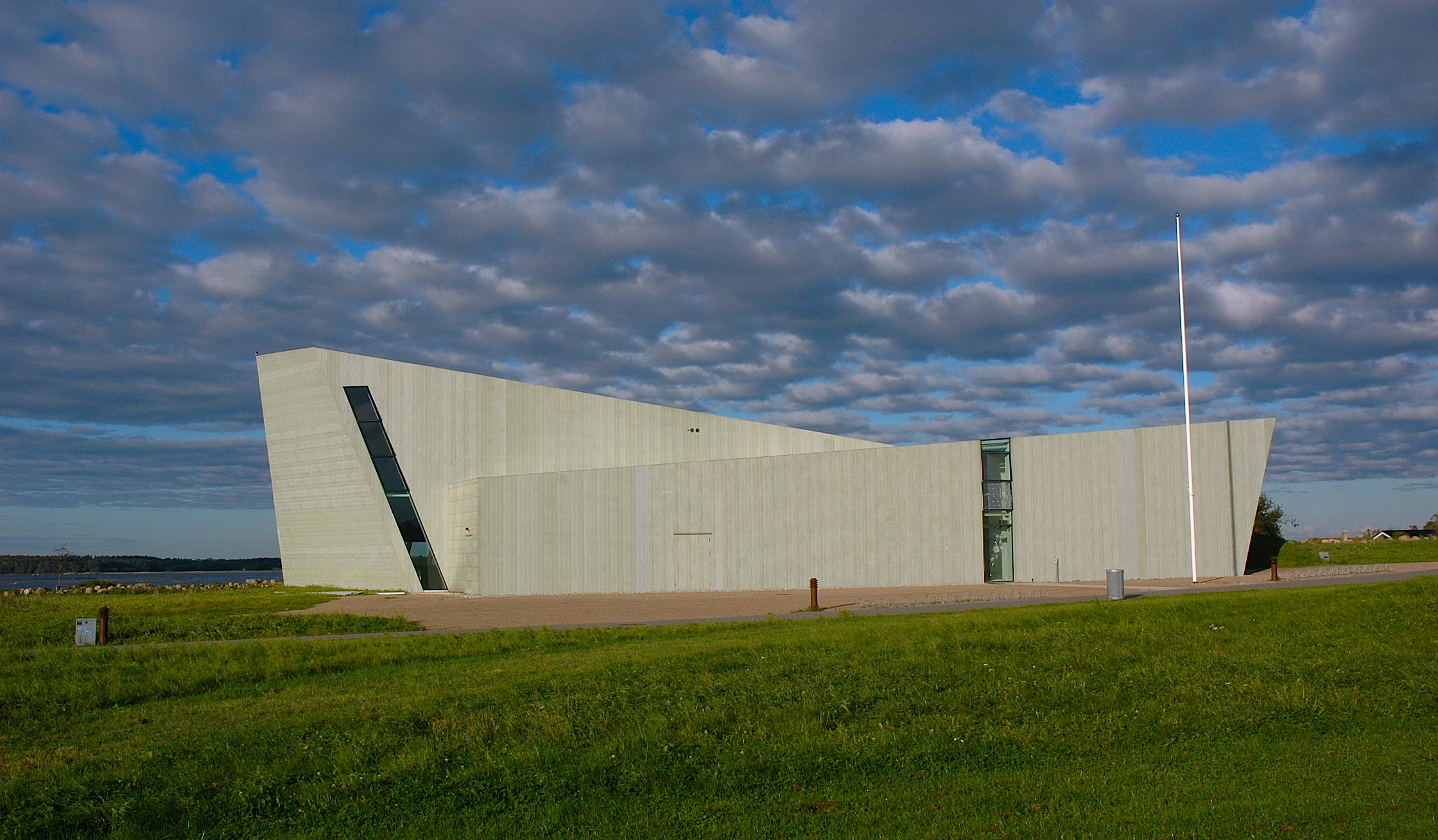
Church of the Holy Cross

Jyllinge has two churches. The medieval Jyllinge Church built around 1100, making it one of the oldest in Denmark. The original Tomanesque church was expanded with the short tower and the porch during the Late Gothic period. The modern Church of the Holy Cross was completed in 2008 to a design by Jan Søndergaards of KHR Arkitekter. It is built in GRP composite.

== Other facilities ==
Jyllinge has two primary schools, Jyllinge School and Baunehøj School. Jyllingecentret is a small shopping centre.

The handball club HØJ Elite plays in the top Danish league on both the women's and men's side.

== Notable people ==
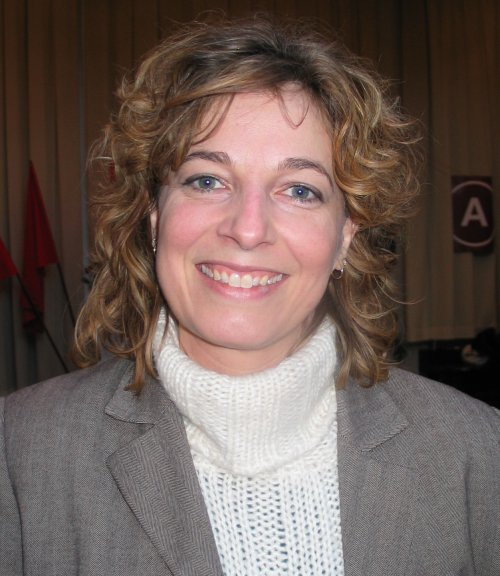
Christine Antorini, 2005

- H. A. Brendekilde (1857 – 1942 in Jyllinge) was a Danish painter, initially social realist style, later more religious and eventually portraying idyllic village life
- Christine Antorini (born 1965 in Jyllinge) a Danish politician, former Minister of Education
- Mette Gjerskov (born 1966 in Jyllinge) a Danish politician, former Minister for Food, Agriculture and Fisheries
- Frank Hansen (born 1983 in Jyllinge) a retired Danish football defender, ca.400 club caps
- Mikkel Damsgaard (born 2000 in Jyllinge) a Danish football player, 77 caps with FC Nordsjælland
- Martin Smits (born 1994 in Jyllinge) a Danish karateka, representing the Danish National Karate Team

== See also ==
- Gundsømagle
