= Egernsund =

- Town
- Location within Region of Southern Denmark Location within Denmark
- Coordinates: 54°54′22″N 9°36′53″E
- Country: Denmark
- Region: Southern Denmark
- Municipality: Sønderborg

Area
  - Urban: 0.9 km^{2} (0.35 sq mi)

Population (2026)
  - Urban: 1,410
  - Urban density: 1,600/km^{2} (4,100/sq mi)
- Time zone: UTC+1 (CET)
  - Summer (DST): UTC+2 (CEST)
- Postal code: DK-6320 Egernsund

Egernsund (German: Ekensund) is a small town, with a population of 1,410 (1 January 2026), in Sønderborg Municipality, Region of Southern Denmark in Denmark.

Egernsund is situated on the northwestern end of the small peninsula of Broager Land on the northern shore of Flensborg Fjord (Flensburg Firth) and east of the short and narrow strait, called Egern Strait, connecting the firth with the small inlet of Nybøl Nor to the north.

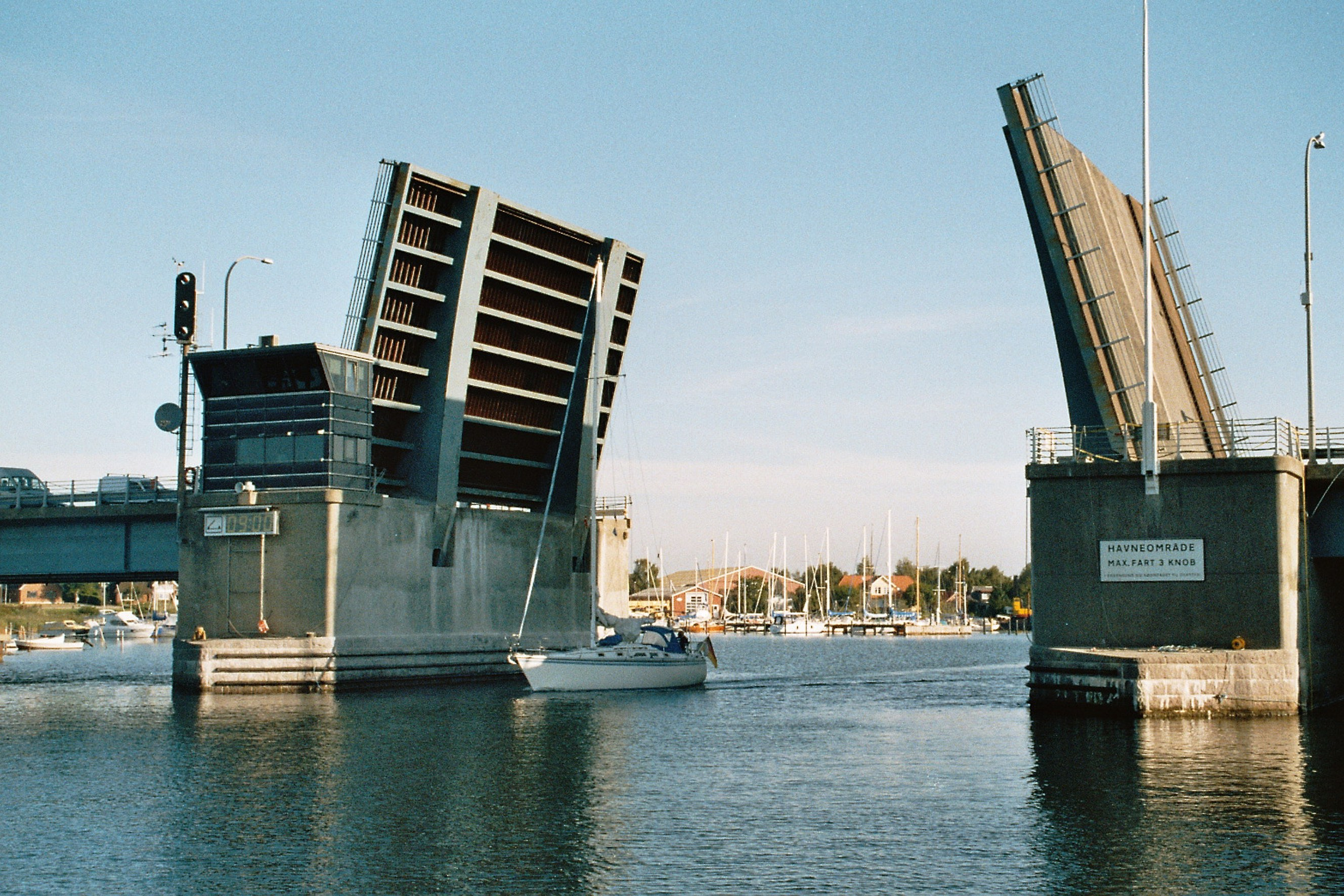
The Egernsund Bridge

The Egernsund Bridge connects Egernsund with Alnor, the southern part of Gråsten, by crossing Egern Strait.

== Egernsund Harbour ==
The small Egernsund Harbour was formerly important for the transport of bricks from the brickworks in and around Egernsund, but this is now done by truck.

== Egernsund Church ==
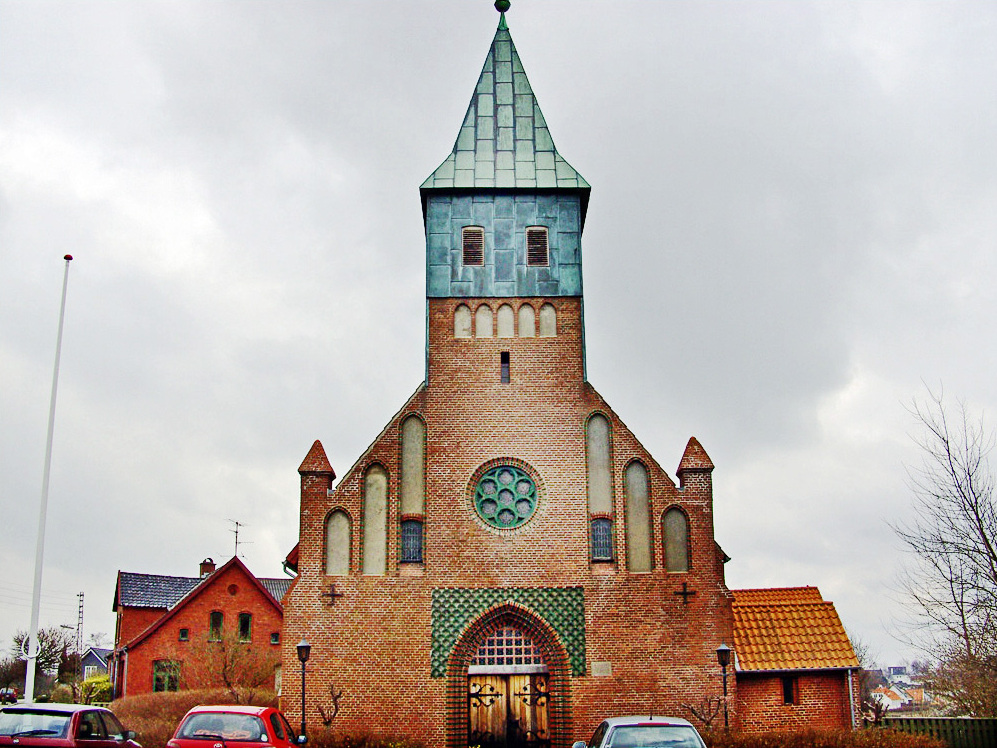
Egernsund Church

Egernsund Church is located in the town. It was built in 1909 of hand stroke stones from the region's own brickworks and is reminiscent of churches in Southern Europe.

== The brickworks ==
Egernsund and Broager Land as a hole was a center for brickproduction in Denmark with more than 40 brickworks operating in the area at its peak around 1890. Petersen Tegl, on the southern shore of Nybbøl Nor, 3 km east of Egernsund and 2 km northwest of Broager is one of the seven remaining brick manufacturer in the area.

Marina Minde, a marina located on the shore of Flensborg Fjord just southeast of Egernsund, is named after one of the demolished brickworks in the area. It used to be where the marina is now, until it closed down in 1965.

Another demolished brickworks Rendbjerg Brickworks was located a few hundred meters east of the marina by the small settlement of Rendbjerg. The site is now used as a summer camp by Esbjerg Municipality.
