= Rendbjerg Brickworks =

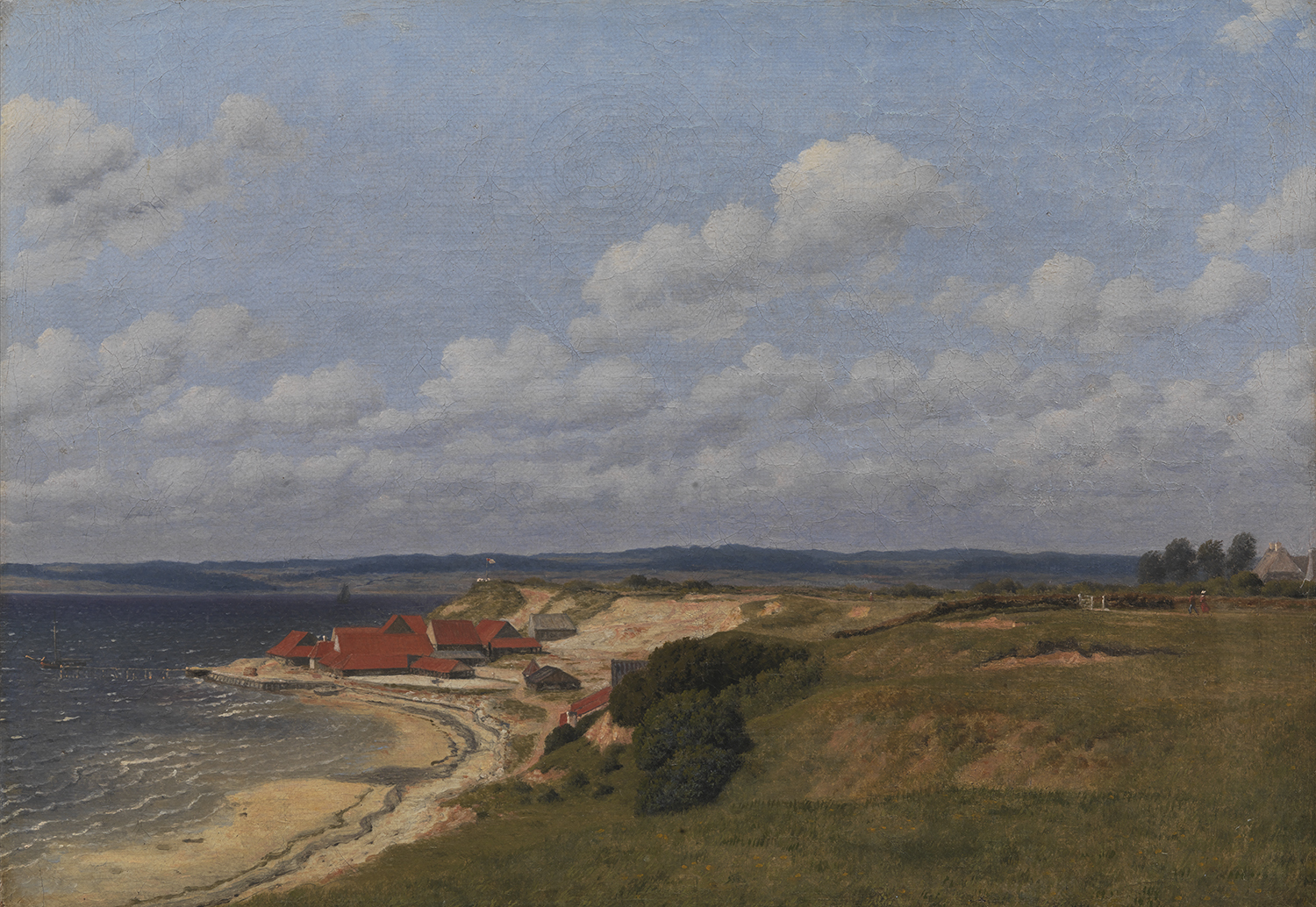
Rendbjerg Brickworks painted by C. W. Eckersberg.

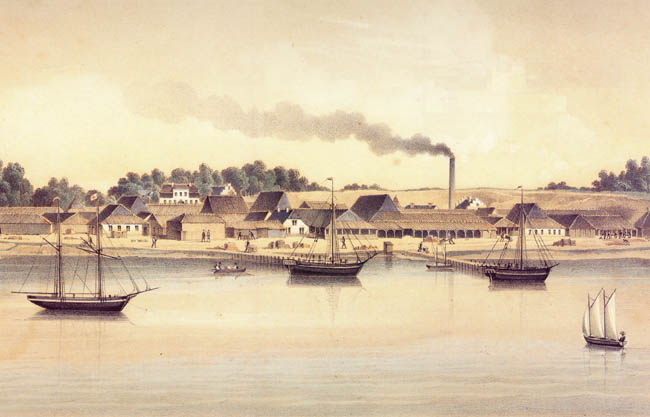
Rendbjerg Brickworks

Rendbjerg Brickworks (Danish: Rendbjerg Teglværk) was a brickworks at Egernsund in Sønderjylland, Denmark. The buildings have been demolished and the site is now used as a summer camp by Esbjerg Municipality.

== History ==
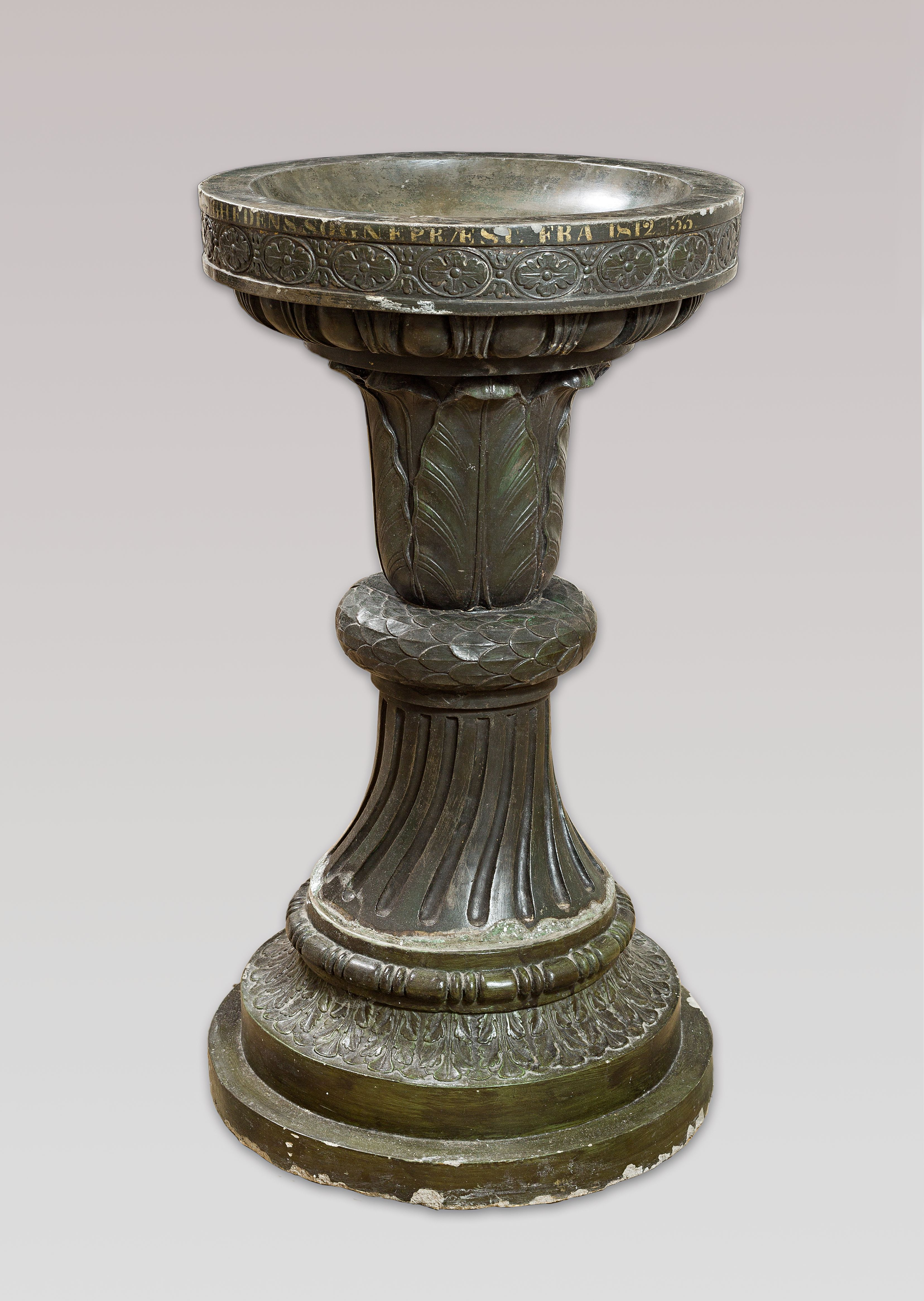
Baptismal font for Rudkøbing Church created at Rendbjerg Vrickworks in 1938..

Rendbjerg Brickworks was founded in 1783. Hans Heinrich Dithmer, a son of the vicar in Broager, acquired the brickyard in 1805. Under his management it grew to become one of the largest in the Nordic countries. In 1822, Dithmer went to Germany and the Netherlands on a travel stipend from Frederick VI. This inspired him to make hard-burnt, waterproof floor tiles. In 1723, he was awarded the Order of the Dannebrog.

Hans Heinrich Dithmer died in 1848 and Rendbjerg Brickworks was then continued by his eldest son, Hans Heinrich Dithmer Jr. Another son established Klostermosegaard Brickworks at Helsingør, while a third son ran a brickworks at Flensburg. Hans Heinrich Dithmer Jr. went bankrupt in 1883 but the brickyard was then continued by new owners. It closed in 1928.
