= Flensburg Firth =

Westernmost inlet of the Baltic Sea; on the German and Danish border

Coordinates: 54°47′24″N 09°26′06″E

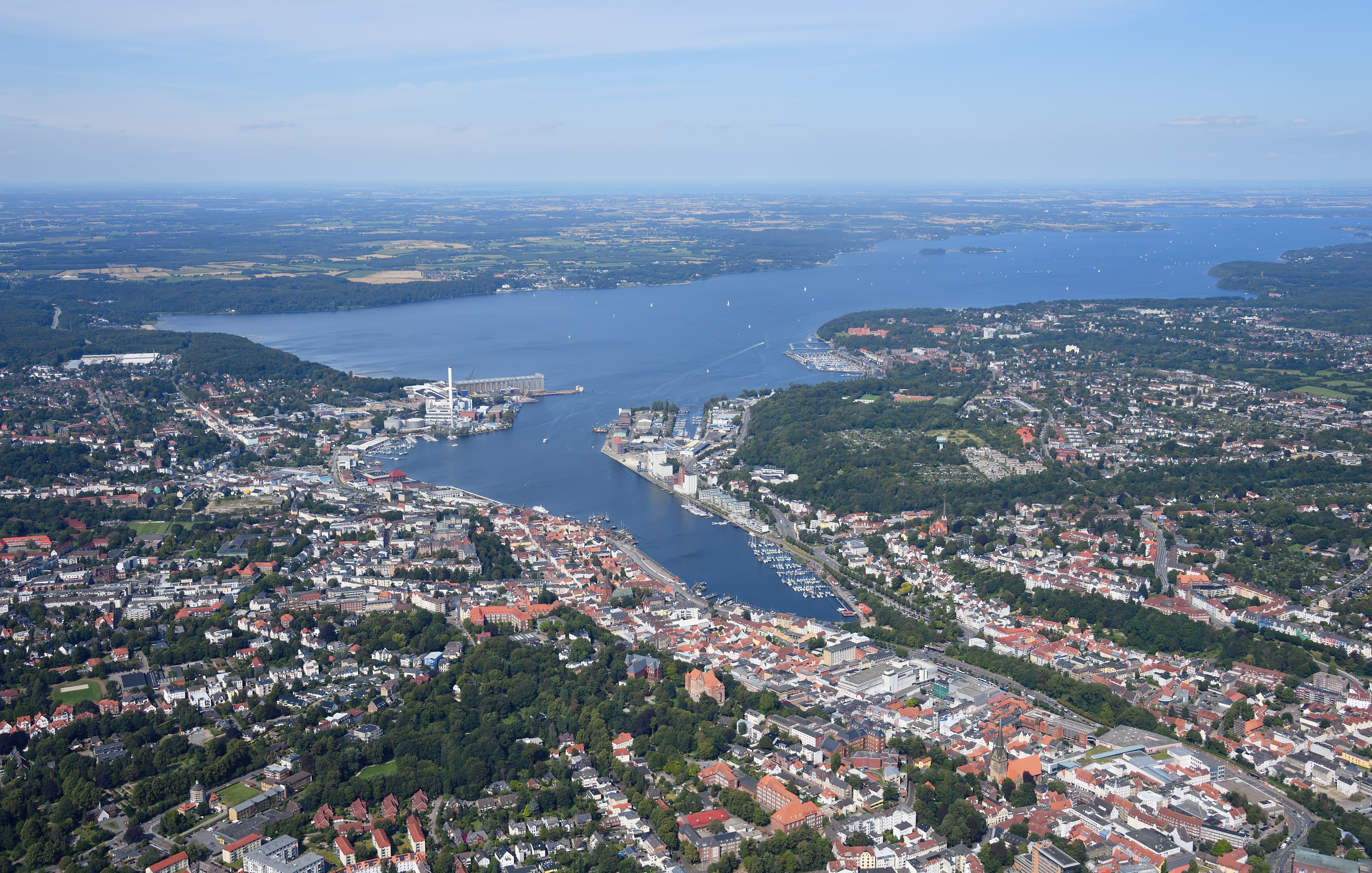
Flensburg Firth with Flensburg in the foreground

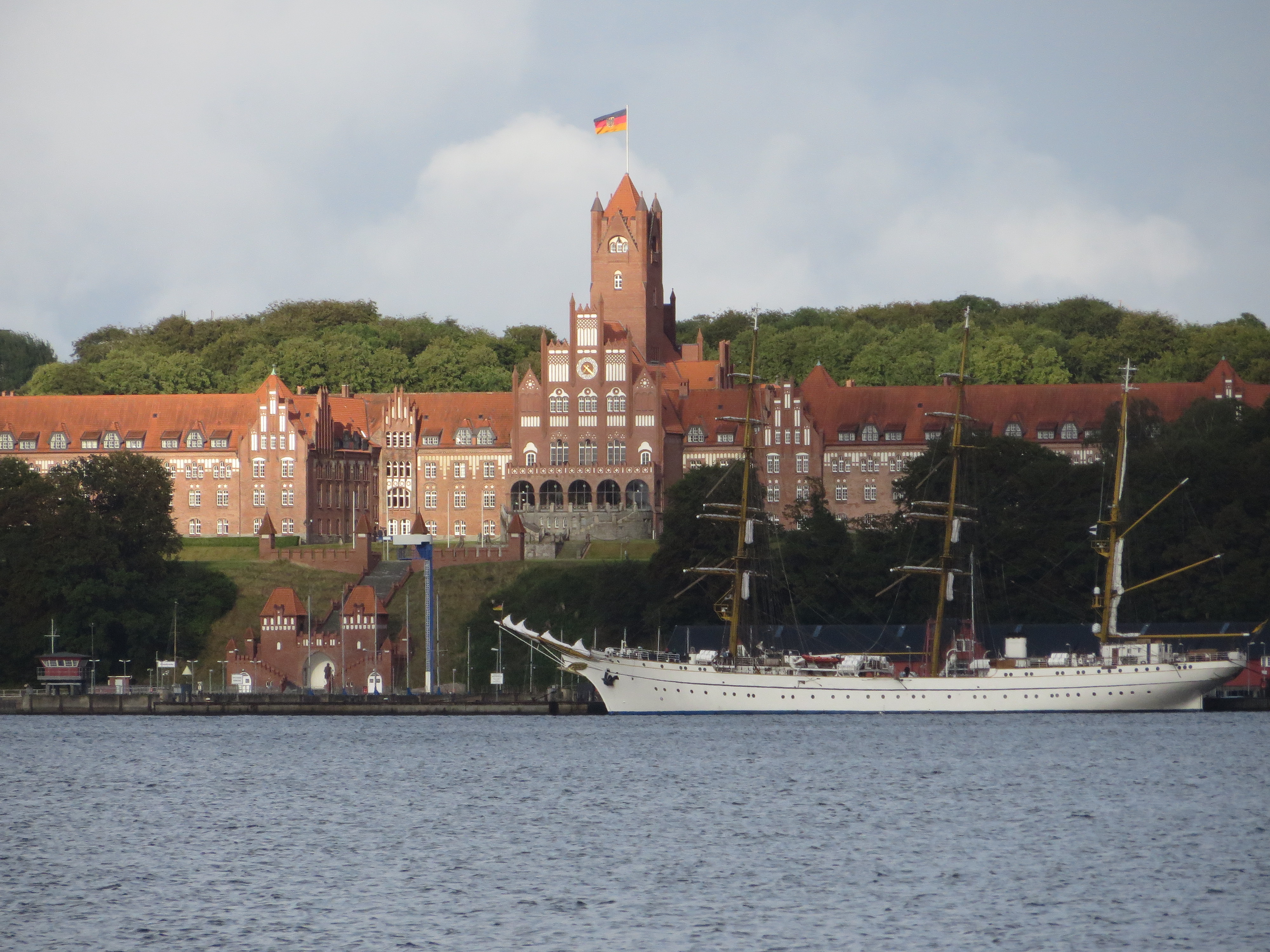
The Naval Academy Mürwik with the Gorch Fock on the Flensburg Firth

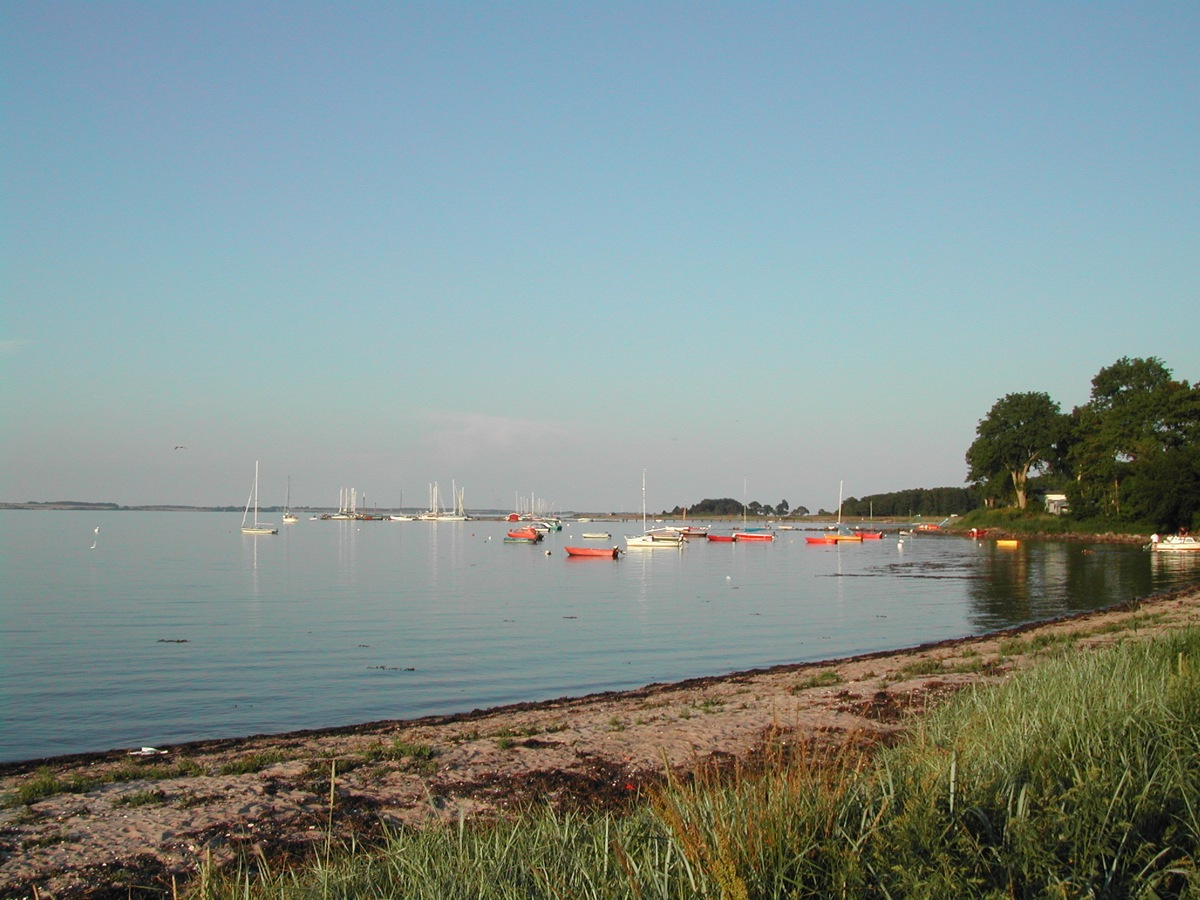
Flensburg Firth seen from Bockholmwik on the German side with Denmark in the background

Flensburg Firth or Flensborg Fjord (German: Flensburger Förde; Danish: Flensborg Fjord) is the westernmost inlet of the Baltic Sea. It forms part of the border between Germany to the south and Denmark to the north, on the eastern side of Schleswig Holstein and Jutland, respectively. Its length is between 40 and 50 kilometres (25 and 31 mi), depending on where it is considered to begin. It has the largest area of all the fjords of East Jutland, which are a special type of inlet, different from geological fjords.

Two peninsulas, Broager on the northern side and Holnis on the southern side, divide the inlet into an outer and an inner part. West of them, near the Danish coast, there are two small islands called Okseøerne (meaning Ox Isles).

On the Danish side, the outer part of the northern end of the firth is partly closed off by the island of Als, with the town of Sønderborg on it. Towards the west, continuing on the Danish side, are Broager, Egernsund, Gråsten, Rinkenæs, Sønderhav, and Kollund.

In Germany at the Danish border, there is Harrislee, at the inner end of the inlet the town of Flensburg, east of it on the southern shore the town of Glücksburg and the villages of Munkbrarup, Langballig, Westerholz, Quern, Steinbergkirche, Niesgrau, Gelting, and Nieby.

The tourist attractions of the Flensburg Firth are the church of Broager, the Ox Isles, Sønderborg Castle, Glücksburg Castle, the Naval Academy Mürwik (known as the Red Castle) and the harbour of Flensburg.
