= Fritz Stoltenberg =

German painter

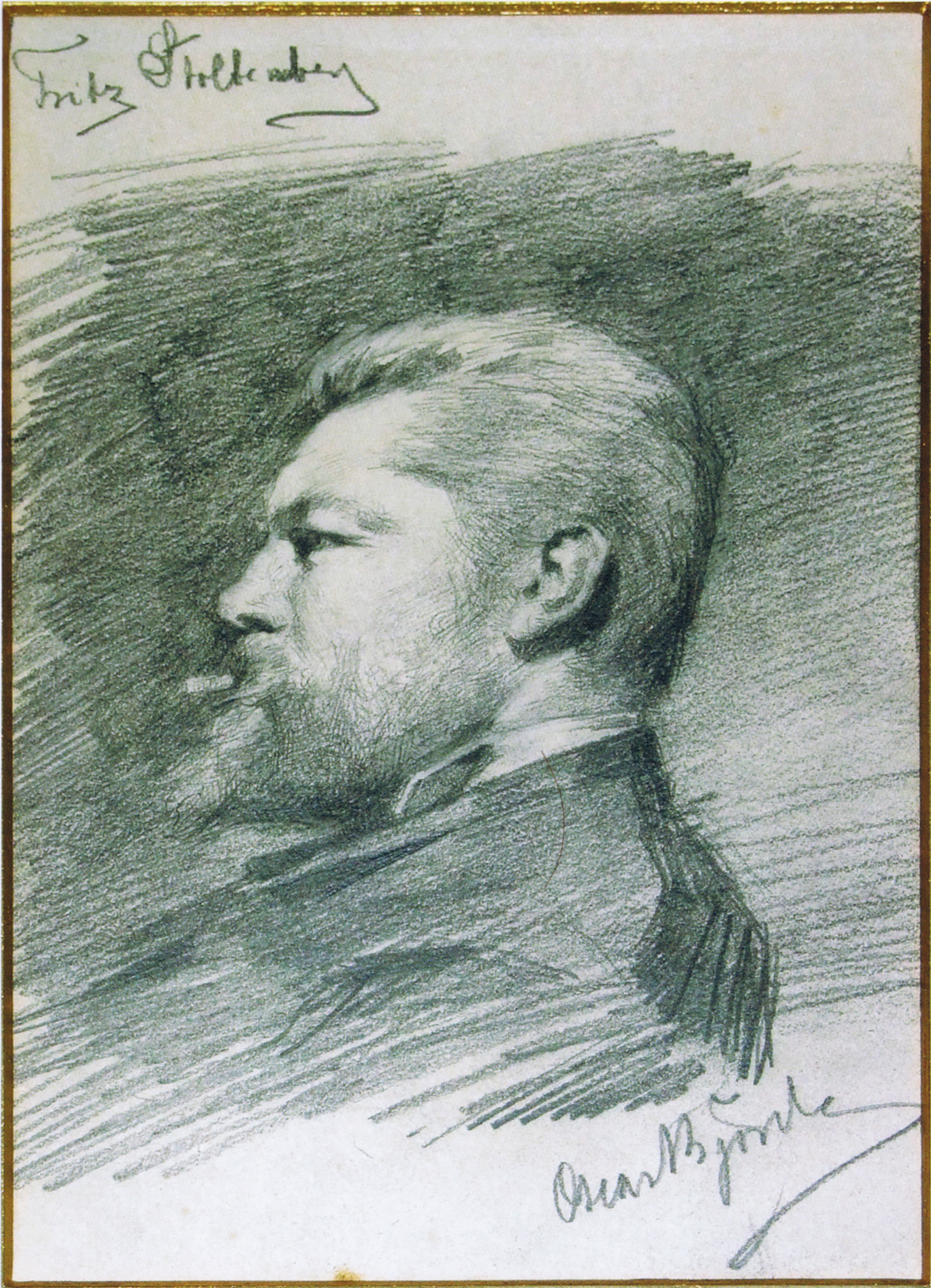
Oscar Björck: Fritz Stoltenberg, sketched in 1884

Fritz Stoltenberg (7 April 1855 -13 November 1921) was a German landscape and marine painter. After a summer with the Skagen Painters in 1884, he returned to Kiel where he painted and sketched the old town and the harbor, publishing many of his illustrations in local magazines.

== Early life ==
Born in 1855 as the son of a sea captain in the north German town of Kiel, by the age of 17 Stoltenberg had already demonstrated his artistic talents with sketches of his home town and its idyllic surroundings. Thanks to his studies at the academies of Weimar, Munich and Kassel, he became a skilled draftsman and landscape painter, supplemented by extensive travels to Italy, Algeria, France, Norway, Belgium and the Netherlands.

== Career ==
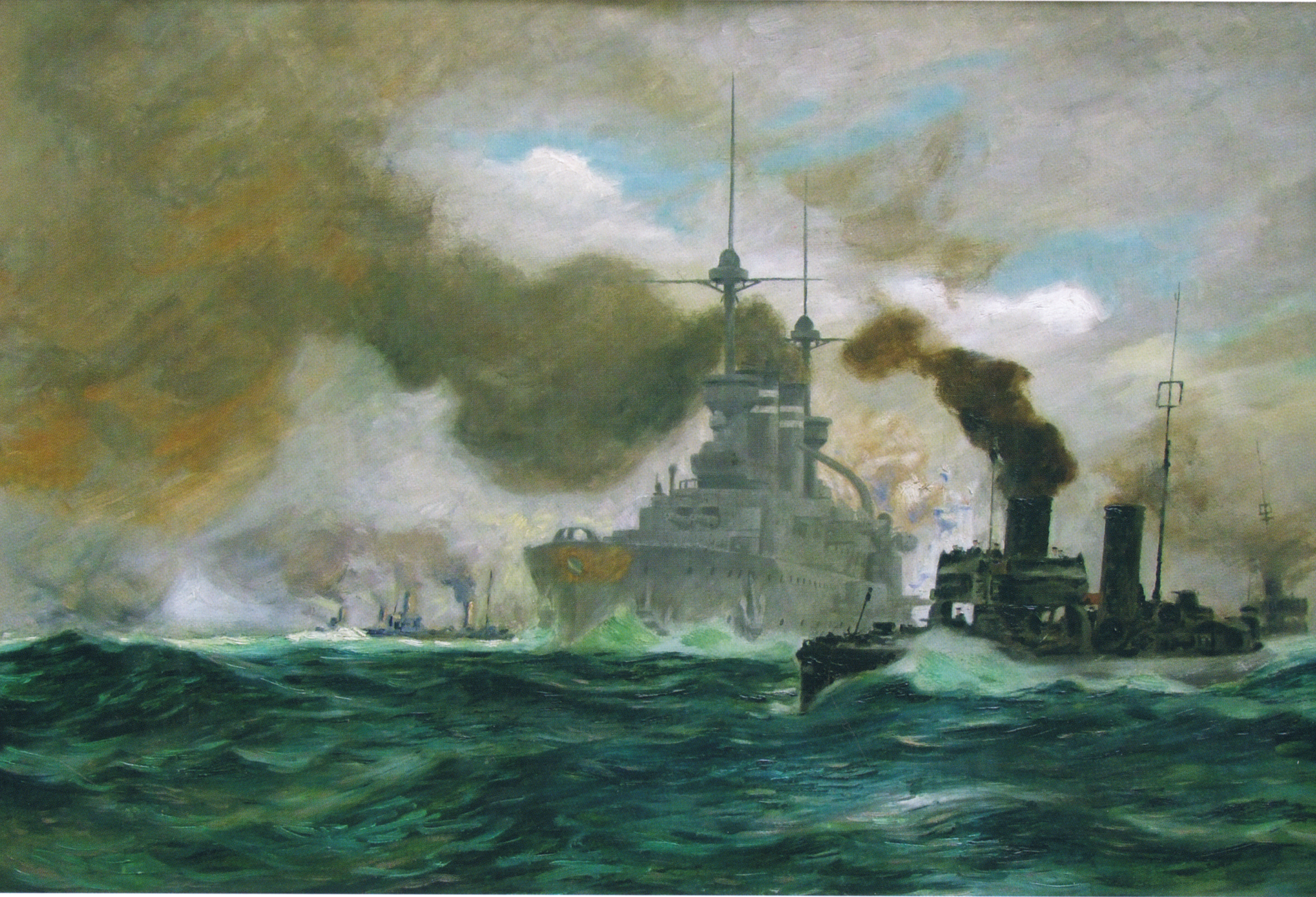
The SMS Zähringen on Maneuvers

In 1882, Stoltenberg became associated with the painters who gathered each summer in Egernsund on the north coast of Flensburg Firth to paint and sketch in the open air. He was the only Egernsund artist to join the Skagen Painters in the far north of Jutland, Denmark, arriving in Skagen in 1884. There his painting benefitted from his associations with P.S. Krøyer, Michael Ancher and Oscar Björck. It is believed his photographs of a lunch in the garden of the Anchers house on Markvej in Skagen in 1884 may have served P.S. Krøyer as a basis for his painting Hip, Hip, Hurrah!.

After making a name for himself as a plein air painter, in 1889 Stoltenberg married Anna Scharenberg from a well-to-do Hamburg family, settling in his home town of Kiel. There he painted scenes of the city and its harbor, publishing some 2,000 illustrations, mainly engravings, in the more popular weeklies of the day. Of particular note are his sketches of the old town and the fishing village of Alt Ellerbek, not to mention his illustrations of the latest developments in marine engineering. He also painted the German fleet and its crews sailing on the Kiel Firth.

In 1894, together with Georg Burmester, Hans Olde and Julius Fürst, he founded the Schleswig-Holstein Cultural Association which he chaired until 1900. In 1914, he retired to Schönberg where he died in 1921.

== Literature ==
- Tellre Wolf-Timm, Doris Tillmann: Fritz Stoltenberg – Ein Landschafts- und Marinemaler aus Kiel, Bossen, Heizte, 2009, ISBN 978-3-8042-1269-5 (in German)
- Tillmann, Doris; Wolf-Timm, Telse; Kramer, Lisa; Wolf, Mareike (2008). Fritz Stoltenberg (1855–1921): ein Landschafts- und Marinemaler aus Kiel (in German). Boyens. ISBN 978-3-8042-1269-5.
