= Klostermosegaard Brickworks =

Former brickworks in Helsingør, Denmark

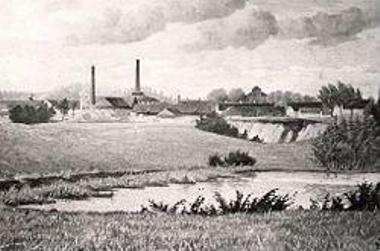
Klostermosegaard Brickworks

Klostermosegaard Brickworks (Danish: Klostermosegaard Teglværk) was a brickworks in Helsingør, Denmark. Only the main building from 1861 has survived. It is located at Klostermosevej 117.

== History ==
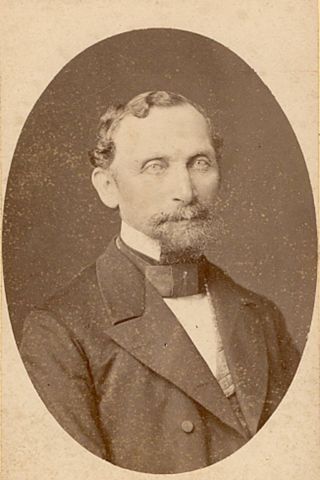
George Friedrich Dithmer

Klostermosegaard Brickworks was founded in 1846 by George Friedrich Dithmer. He had just arrived in North Zealand from Broager in Sønderjylland where his father Hans Heinrich Dithmer owned Rendbjerg Brickworks. He purchased Klostermose from the city in 1848 and planted Klostermose Skov. Ditmer was joined by Fritz Hansen Friedrichsen, the 16 years old son of one of his father's employees, who would later acquire Sølyst Brickworks.

In 1855, Klostermosegaard introduced steam power, probably as the first brickyard in Denmark. 1861 say the construction of a new main building as well as the first Hoffmann kiln in Denmark. By 1872, Klostermosegaard Brickworks was the third largest brickworks in Denmark.

The company ran into economic difficulties in the early 1880s and was ultimately and was taken over by Den Danske Landmandsbank. The bank sold the main building and charged one of Dithmer's son with managing the brickyard until it was sold to Frederiksholm Kalk- og Teglværker in 1912. It closed on 16 January 1916.

== Legacy ==
The former head office from 1861 is located at Klostermosevej 117, The building is today owned by Copenhagen Municipality and operated as a social institution. The industrial buildings were located on the other side of the road but have been demolished.
