= Georg Burmester =

German Impressionist painter

- Born: December 4, 1864
- Died: June 30, 1936 (aged 71)
- Education: Kunstakademie Düsseldorf
- Known for: Painting
- Movement: Impressionism

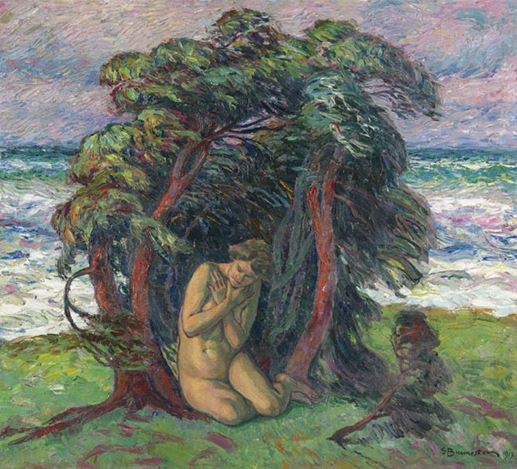
The Storm

Georg Burmester (4 December 1864, Barmen - 30 June 1936, Heikendorf) was a German Impressionist painter.

== Life and work ==
He was born to Adolf Burmester, Director of the local Realschule, and Charlotte Henriette Marie née Ritter. From 1881 to 1883, he studied at the Kunstakademie Düsseldorf with Heinrich Lauenstein and Hugo Crola. He then transferred to the Academy of Fine Arts, Karlsruhe, where his primary instructor was Gustav Schönleber.

In 1886, he made a study trip to Italy then, from 1887 to 1888, performed his mandatory military service. After completing his studies, in 1889, he moved to Kiel and befriended his fellow artist, Ernst Eitner. Upon his recommendation, he later went to work at the Gothmund Artists' Colony.

In 1894, he was a founding member of the Schleswig-Holstein Art Cooperative. The following year, he married Anne Nitzsch, the daughter of a Senator from Berlin, and settled in Möltenort, near Heikendorf. From there, he made study trips to Copenhagen and Norway. Together with Fritz Stoltenberg, he established an art school in 1905. He was awarded the Villa Romana Prize in 1907, and stayed in Florence for a year.

From 1912 to 1930, he was a teacher at the Kunstakademie Kassel, and received the title of Professor in 1917. His best known student from this period was the landscape painter, Sepp Vees. After 1930, he returned to Möltenort and was active at the Heikendorf Atists' Colony.
