= SMS Zähringen =

Battleship of the German Imperial Navy

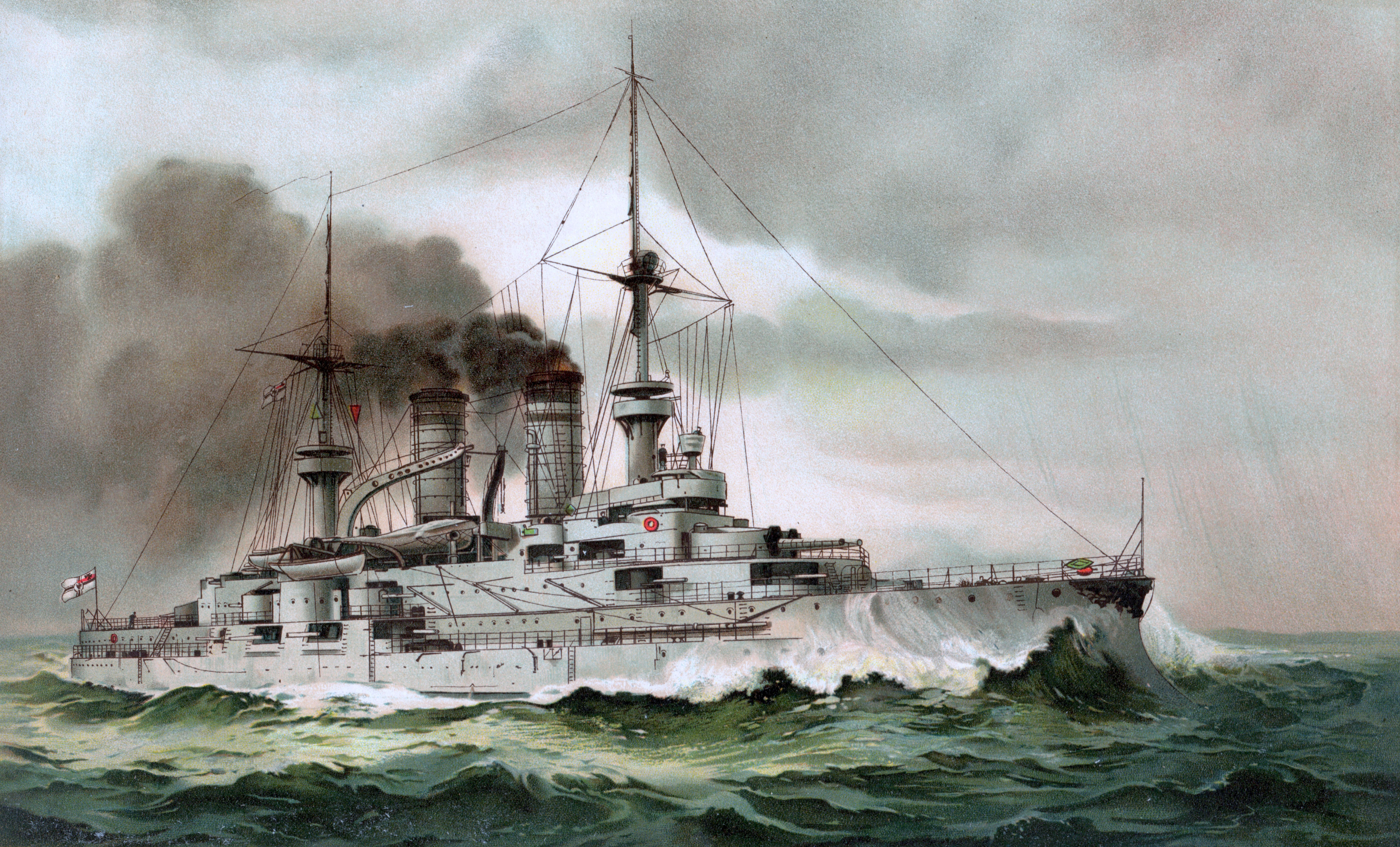
- Lithograph of Zähringen in 1902

History

Germany
- Name: Zähringen
- Namesake: House of Zähringen
- Builder: Germaniawerft, Kiel
- Laid down: 21 November 1899
- Launched: 12 June 1901
- Commissioned: 25 October 1902
- Recommissioned: 8 August 1928
- Reclassified: Converted to target ship, 1928
- Stricken: 11 March 1920
- Fate: Sunk as a blockship 26 March 1945. Broken up 1949-1950

General characteristics
- Class & type: Wittelsbach-class battleship
- Displacement: Normal: 11,774 t (11,588 long tons); Full-load displacement: 12,798 t (12,596 long tons)
- Length: 126.8 m (416 ft) (loa)
- Beam: 22.8 m (74 ft 10 in)
- Draft: 7.95 m (26 ft 1 in)
- Installed power: 14,000 PS (13,810 ihp; 10,300 kW); 12 × cylindrical boilers
- Propulsion: 3 × triple-expansion steam engines; 3 × screw propellers
- Speed: 18 knots (33 km/h; 21 mph)
- Range: 5,000 nautical miles (9,300 km; 5,800 mi); 10 knots (19 km/h; 12 mph)
- Complement: 33 officers; 650 enlisted men
- Armament: 4 × 24 cm (9.4 in) guns (40 cal.); 18 × 15 cm (5.9 in) SK L/40 guns; 12 × 8.8 cm (3.5 in) SK L/30 guns; 12 × 3.7 cm (1.5 in) machine cannon; 6 × 45 cm (17.7 in) torpedo tubes
- Armor: Belt: 100 to 225 mm (3.9 to 8.9 in); Turrets: 250 mm (9.8 in); Deck: 50 mm (2 in)

SMS Zähringen (German: Seiner Majestät Schiff Zähringen; English: His Majesty's Ship Zähringen) was the third Wittelsbach-class pre-dreadnought battleship of the German Imperial Navy (Kaiserliche Marine). Laid down in 1899 at the Germaniawerft shipyard in Kiel, she was launched on 12 June 1901 and commissioned on 25 October 1902. Her sisters were Wittelsbach, Wettin, Schwaben and Mecklenburg; they were the first capital ships built under the Navy Law of 1898, brought about by Admiral Alfred von Tirpitz. The ship, named for the former royal House of Zähringen, was armed with a main battery of four 24 cm (9.4 in) guns and had a top speed of 18 knots (33 km/h; 21 mph).

Zähringen saw active duty in I Squadron of the German fleet for the majority of her career. During this period, she was occupied with extensive annual training and making good-will visits to foreign countries. The training exercises conducted during this period provided the framework for the High Seas Fleet's operations during World War I. She was decommissioned in September 1910, but returned to service briefly for training in 1912, where she accidentally rammed and sank a torpedo boat. After the start of World War I in August 1914, Zähringen was brought back to active duty in IV Battle Squadron. The ship saw limited duty in the Baltic Sea, including during the Battle of the Gulf of Riga in August 1915, but saw no combat with Russian forces. By late 1915, crew shortages and the threat of British submarines forced the Kaiserliche Marine to withdraw older battleships like Zähringen.

Instead, Zähringen was relegated to a target ship for torpedo training in 1917. In the mid-1920s, she was heavily reconstructed and equipped for use as a radio-controlled target ship. She served in this capacity until 1944, when she was sunk in Gotenhafen by British bombers during World War II. The retreating Germans raised the ship and moved her to the harbor mouth, where they scuttled her to block the port. Zähringen was broken up in situ in 1949–50.

== Design ==
After the German Kaiserliche Marine (Imperial Navy) ordered the four Brandenburg-class battleships in 1889, a combination of budgetary constraints, opposition in the Reichstag (Imperial Diet), and a lack of a coherent fleet plan delayed the acquisition of further battleships. The Secretary of the Reichsmarineamt (Imperial Navy Office), Vizeadmiral (VAdm—Vice Admiral) Friedrich von Hollmann struggled throughout the early and mid-1890s to secure parliamentary approval for the first three Kaiser Friedrich III-class battleships. In June 1897, Hollmann was replaced by Konteradmiral (KAdm—Rear Admiral) Alfred von Tirpitz, who quickly proposed and secured approval for the first Naval Law in early 1898. The law authorized the last two ships of the class, as well as the five ships of the Wittelsbach class, the first class of battleship built under Tirpitz's tenure. The Wittelsbachs were broadly similar to the Kaiser Friedrichs, carrying the same armament but with a more comprehensive armor layout.

=== Characteristics ===
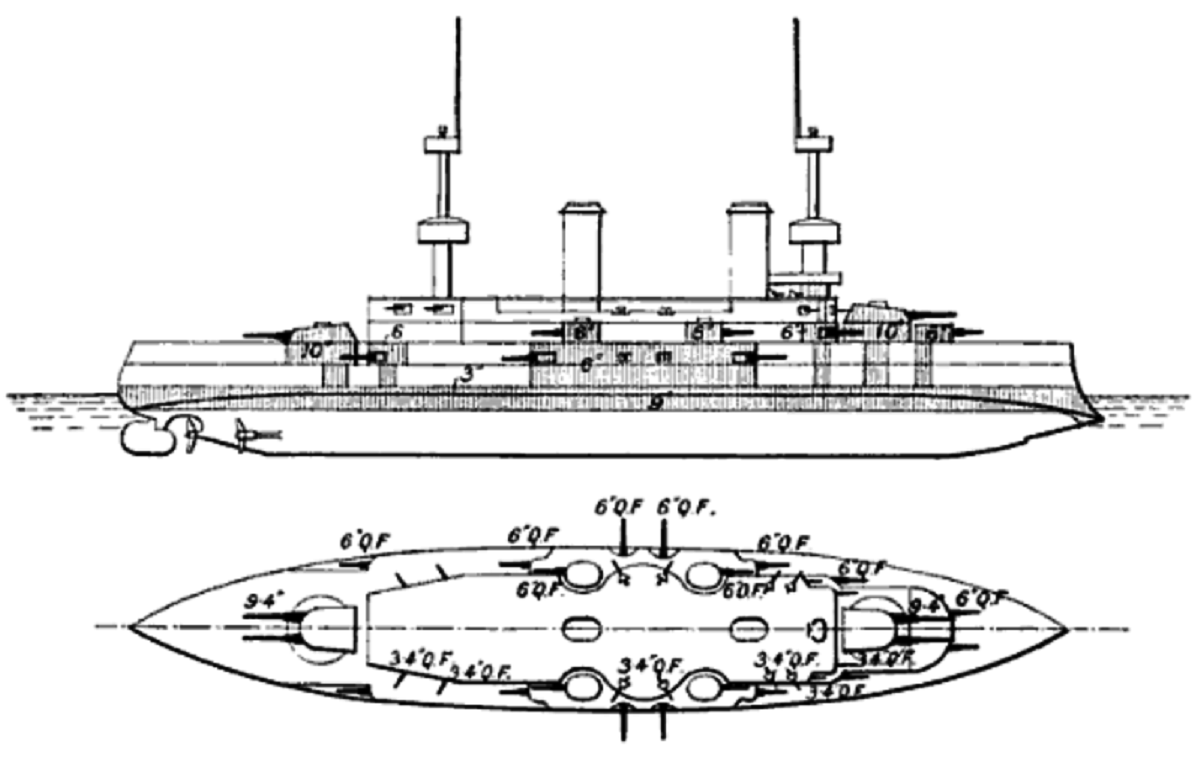
Plan and profile drawing of the Wittelsbach class

Zähringen was 126.8 m (416 ft) long overall and had a beam of 22.8 m (74 ft 10 in) and a draft of 7.95 m (26 ft 1 in) forward. She displaced 11,774 t (11,588 long tons) as designed and up to 12,798 t (12,596 long tons) at full load. The ship had a large superstructure that included an armored conning tower forward, along with a flush deck. Her hull featured a pronounced ram bow. She had a crew of 30 officers and 650 enlisted men.

The ship was powered by three 3-cylinder vertical triple expansion engines that drove three screws. Steam was provided by six Marine-type and six cylindrical boilers, all of which burned coal and were vented through a pair of large funnels located amidships. Zähringen's powerplant was rated at 14,000 metric horsepower (13,810 ihp; 10,300 kW), which generated a top speed of 18 knots (33 km/h; 21 mph). The ship had a cruising radius of 5,000 nautical miles (9,300 km; 5,800 mi) at a speed of 10 knots (19 km/h; 12 mph).

Zähringen's armament consisted of a main battery of four 24 cm (9.4 in) SK L/40 guns in twin-gun turrets, (Note: In Imperial German Navy gun nomenclature, "SK" (Schnelladekanone) denotes that the gun is quick firing, while the L/40 denotes the length of the gun. In this case, the L/40 gun is 40 caliber, meaning that the gun is 40 times as long as it is in diameter.) one fore and one aft of the central superstructure. Her secondary armament consisted of eighteen 15 cm (5.9 inch) SK L/40 guns that were mounted in casemates. Six of these were placed in the hull and the other six were in the superstructure, two of which were forward-firing under the forward turret. Close-range defense against torpedo boats was provided by a tertiary battery of twelve 8.8 cm (3.45 in) SK L/30 quick-firing guns and twelve 3.7 cm (1.5 in) machine cannon in the upper superstructure. The armament suite was rounded out with six 45 cm (17.7 in) torpedo tubes, all submerged in the hull; one was in the bow, one in the stern, and the other four were on the broadside.

Zähringen was protected with Krupp armor. Her armor belt was 225 millimeters (8.9 in) thick in the central citadel that protected her magazines and machinery spaces and reduced to 100 mm (3.9 in) on either end of the hull. Horizontal protection was provided by an armor deck that was 50 mm (2 in) thick; it sloped down at the sides and connected to the bottom edge of the belt. The sloped sides increased in thickness to 75–120 mm (3.0–4.7 in). The main battery turrets had 250 mm (9.8 in) of armor plating on their faces and the secondary casemates received 140 mm (5.5 in) of armor plate. Her conning tower was protected with 250 mm of armor.

== Service history ==
=== Construction to 1904 ===
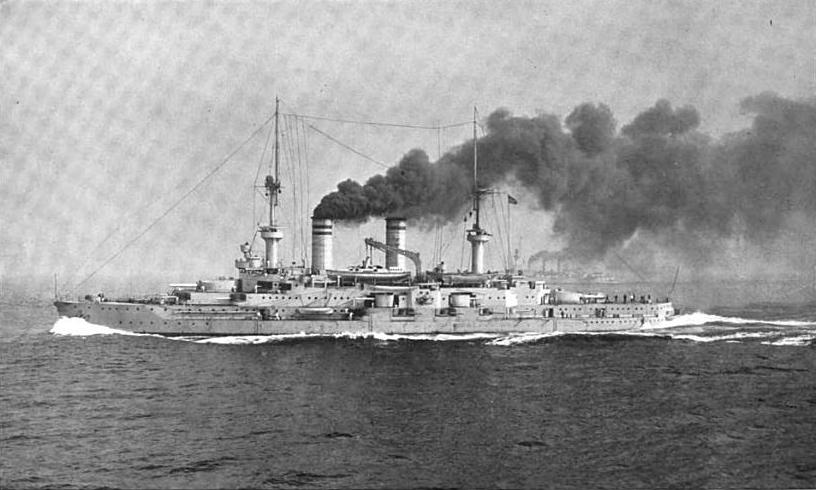
SMS Zähringen at high speed

Zähringen was ordered under the contract name "E", as a new unit for the fleet. (Note: German warships were ordered under provisional names. Additions to the fleet were given a single letter; ships intended to replace older or lost vessels were ordered as "Ersatz (name of the ship to be replaced)".) Her keel was laid down on 21 November 1899, at Friedrich Krupp's Germaniawerft dockyard in Kiel. Zähringen was launched on 12 June 1901, with her launching speech given by Frederick I, Grand Duke of Baden and head of the House of Zähringen; his wife, Grand Duchess Louise, christened the ship. Zähringen was commissioned on 25 October 1902, and began her sea trials, which lasted until 10 February 1903. She thereafter replaced the battleship Brandenburg in I Squadron of the Active Fleet. On 2 April 1903, the squadron went to sea and began gunnery training two days later. These exercises continued for the rest of the month, interrupted only by heavy storms.

A major training cruise followed the next month; on 10 May the ships departed the Elbe river and made their way into the Atlantic. They cruised south to Spain, passing Ushant on 14 May and reaching the Iberian Peninsula five days later. There, they conducted a reconnaissance exercise off Pontevedra before anchoring in Vigo on 20 May. The squadron departed Spain on 30 May. The ships passed through the Strait of Dover on 3 June and continued into the Kattegat. There, they rendezvoused with the torpedo boats of I Torpedobootsflotille (Torpedo Boat Flotilla)—commanded by Korvettenkapitän (Lieutenant Commander) Franz von Hipper—for a mock attack on the fortifications at Kiel. Later in June, the ships took part in additional gunnery training and were present at the Kiel Week sailing regatta. During Kiel Week, an American squadron that included the battleship USS Kearsarge and four cruisers visited. Following the end of Kiel Week, I Squadron, which had been strengthened with the new cruiser Arcona, and I Torpedobootsflotille went to sea for more tactical and gunnery exercises in the North Sea, which lasted from 6 to 28 July. The annual fleet maneuvers began on 15 August; they consisted of a blockade exercise in the North Sea, a cruise of the entire fleet first to Norwegian waters and then to Kiel in early September, and finally a mock attack on Kiel. The exercises concluded on 12 September. The year's training schedule concluded with a cruise into the eastern Baltic that started on 23 November and a cruise into the Skagerrak that began on 1 December.

Zähringen and the rest of I Squadron participated in an exercise in the Skagerrak from 11 to 21 January 1904. Further squadron exercises followed from 8 to 17 March, and a major fleet exercise took place in the North Sea in May. In July, I Squadron and I Scouting Group visited Britain, including a stop at Plymouth on 10 July. The German fleet departed on 13 July, bound for the Netherlands; I Squadron anchored in Vlissingen the following day. There, the ships were visited by Queen Wilhelmina. I Squadron remained in Vlissingen until 20 July, when they departed for a cruise in the northern North Sea with the rest of the fleet. The squadron stopped in Molde, Norway, on 29 July, while the other units went to other ports. The fleet reassembled on 6 August and steamed back to Kiel, where it conducted a mock attack on the harbor on 12 August. During its cruise in the North Sea, the fleet experimented with wireless telegraphy on a large scale and searchlights at night for communication and recognition signals. Immediately after returning to Kiel, the fleet began preparations for the autumn maneuvers, which began on 29 August in the Baltic. The fleet moved to the North Sea on 3 September, where it took part in a major landing operation, after which the ships took the ground troops from IX Corps that participated in the exercises to Altona for a parade for Wilhelm II. The ships then conducted their own parade for the Kaiser off the island of Helgoland on 6 September. Three days later, the fleet returned to the Baltic via the Kaiser Wilhelm Canal, where it participated in further landing operations with IX Corps and the Guards Corps. On 15 September, the maneuvers came to an end.

=== 1905–1914 ===
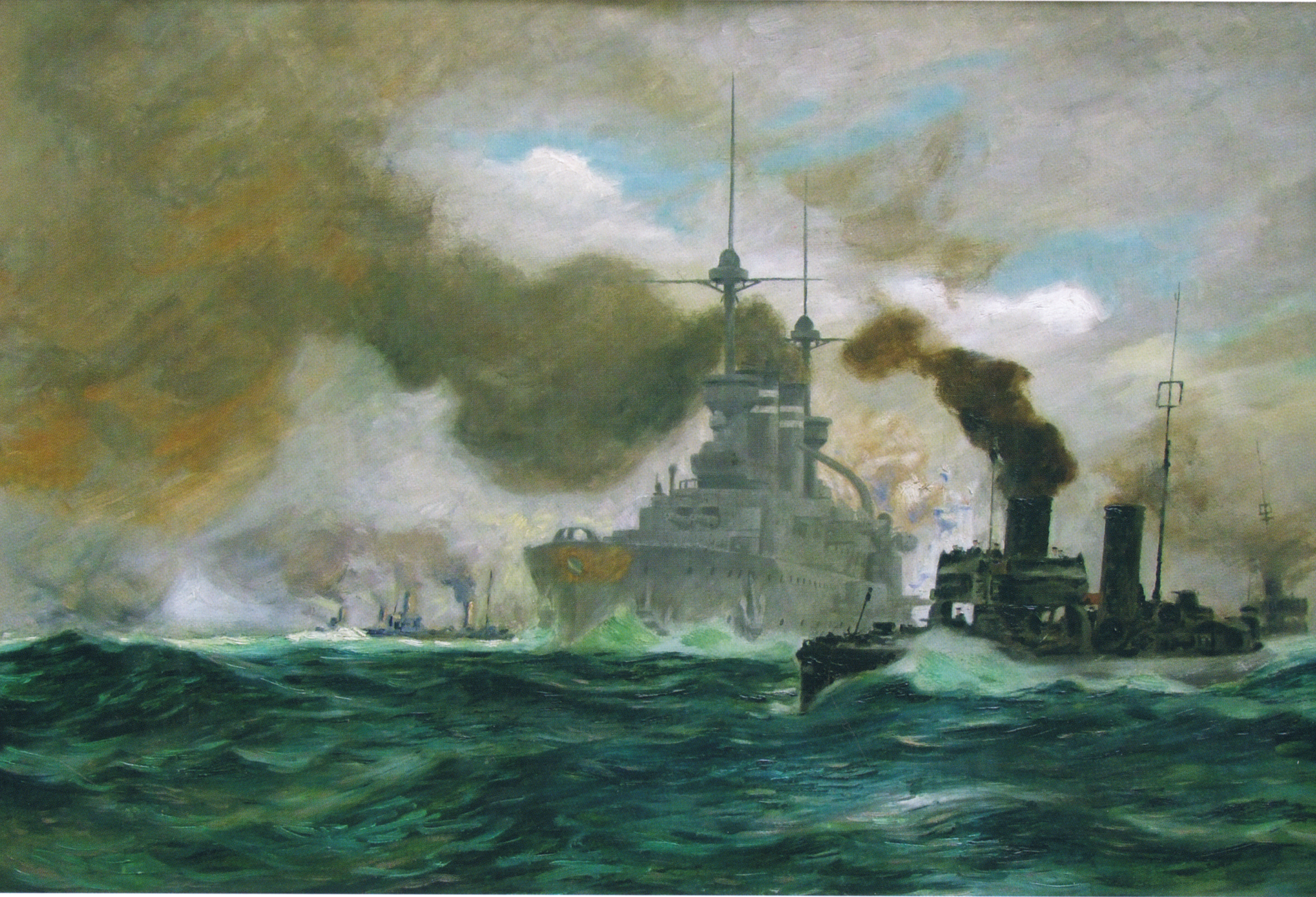
1912 painting of Zähringen on maneuvers by Fritz Stoltenberg

Zähringen took part in a pair of training cruises with I Squadron during 9–19 January and 27 February – 16 March 1905. Individual and squadron training followed, with an emphasis on gunnery drills. On 12 July, the fleet began a major training exercise in the North Sea. The fleet then cruised through the Kattegat and stopped in Copenhagen and Stockholm. The summer cruise ended on 9 August, though the autumn maneuvers that would normally have begun shortly thereafter were delayed by a visit from the British Channel Fleet that month. The British fleet stopped in Danzig, Swinemünde, and Flensburg, where it was greeted by units of the German Navy; Zähringen and the main German fleet was anchored at Swinemünde for the occasion. The visit was strained by the Anglo-German naval arms race. As a result of the British visit, the 1905 autumn maneuvers were shortened considerably, from 6 to 13 September, and consisted only of exercises in the North Sea. The first exercise presumed a naval blockade in the German Bight, and the second envisioned a hostile fleet attempting to force the defenses of the Elbe. In October, I Squadron went on a cruise in the Baltic. In early December, I and II Squadrons went on their regular winter cruise, this time to Danzig, where they arrived on 12 December. While on the return trip to Kiel, the fleet conducted tactical exercises.

The fleet undertook a heavier training schedule in 1906 than in previous years. The ships were occupied with individual, division and squadron exercises throughout April. Starting on 13 May, major fleet exercises took place in the North Sea and lasted until 8 June with a cruise around the Skagen into the Baltic. The fleet began its usual summer cruise to Norway in mid-July. The fleet was present for the birthday of Norwegian King Haakon VII on 3 August. The German ships departed the following day for Helgoland, to join exercises being conducted there. The fleet was back in Kiel by 15 August, where preparations for the autumn maneuvers began. On 22–24 August, the fleet took part in landing exercises in Eckernförde Bay outside Kiel. The maneuvers were paused from 31 August to 3 September when the fleet hosted vessels from Denmark and Sweden, along with a Russian squadron from 3 to 9 September in Kiel. The maneuvers resumed on 8 September and lasted five more days. The ship participated in the uneventful winter cruise into the Kattegat and Skagerrak from 8 to 16 December.

The first quarter of 1907 followed the previous pattern and, on 16 February, the Active Battle Fleet was re-designated the High Seas Fleet. From the end of May to early June the fleet went on its summer cruise in the North Sea, returning to the Baltic via the Kattegat. This was followed by the regular cruise to Norway from 12 July to 10 August. During the autumn maneuvers, which lasted from 26 August to 6 September, the fleet conducted landing exercises in northern Schleswig with IX Corps. The winter training cruise went into the Kattegat from 22 to 30 November. In May 1908, the fleet went on a major cruise into the Atlantic instead of its normal voyage in the North Sea, which included a stop in Horta in the Azores. The fleet returned to Kiel on 13 August to prepare for the autumn maneuvers, which lasted from 27 August to 7 September. Division exercises in the Baltic immediately followed from 7 to 13 September. In February 1909, Zähringen was employed as an icebreaker for the ports of the western Baltic.

On 21 September 1910, Zähringen was decommissioned and her crew was transferred to the new dreadnought battleship Rheinland, which had recently been completed. Zähringen was then assigned to the Reserve Division of the North Sea, though the unit was dissolved on 12 May 1912, and its ships transferred to the Reserve Division of the Baltic Sea. Zähringen was recommissioned briefly, from 9 to 12 May, to transfer her to Kiel. She returned to service again later that year, from 14 August to 28 September, to take part in that year's fleet maneuvers as part of III Squadron. While exercising on 4 September, Zähringen accidentally rammed and sank the torpedo boat G171. Seven men from G171 were killed in the accident. Zähringen was again decommissioned after the conclusion of the exercises, and did not return to service until the start of World War I in August 1914.

=== World War I ===
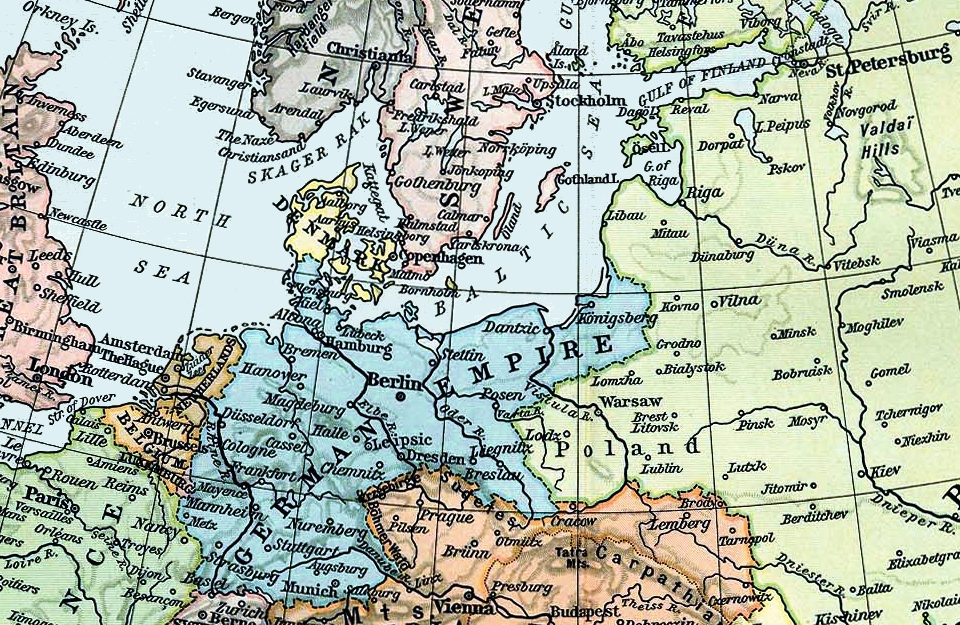
Map of the North and Baltic Seas in 1911

At the start of World War I, Zähringen was mobilized as part of IV Battle Squadron, along with her four sister ships and the battleships Elsass and Braunschweig. The squadron was divided into VII and VIII Divisions, with Zähringen assigned to the former. On 26 August, the ships were sent to rescue the stranded light cruiser Magdeburg, which had run aground off the island of Odensholm in the eastern Baltic, but by 28 August, the ship's crew had been forced to detonate explosives to destroy Magdeburg before the relief force had arrived. As a result, Zähringen and the rest of the squadron cruised back toward Bornholm that day.

Starting on 3 September, IV Squadron, assisted by the armored cruiser Blücher, conducted a sweep into the Baltic. The operation lasted until 9 September and failed to bring Russian naval units to battle. Two days later the ships were transferred to the North Sea, though they stayed there only briefly, returning to the Baltic on 20 September. From 22 to 26 September, the squadron took part in a sweep into the eastern Baltic in an unsuccessful attempt to find and destroy Russian warships. From 4 December 1914 to 2 April 1915, the ships of IV Squadron were tasked with coastal defense duties along Germany's North Sea coast against incursions from the British Royal Navy.

The German Army requested naval assistance for its campaign against Russia; Prince Heinrich, the commander of all naval forces in the Baltic, made VII Division, IV Scouting Group, and the torpedo boats of the Baltic fleet available for the operation. On 6 May, the IV Squadron ships were tasked with providing support to the assault on Libau. Zähringen and the other ships were stationed off Gotland to intercept any Russian cruisers that might attempt to intervene in the landings; the Russians did not do so. After cruisers from IV Scouting Group encountered Russian cruisers off Gotland, the ships of VII Division deployed—with a third dummy funnel erected to disguise them as the more powerful Braunschweig-class battleships—along with the cruiser Danzig. The ships advanced as far as the island of Utö on 9 May and to Kopparstenarna the following day, but by then the Russian cruisers had withdrawn. Later that day, the British submarines HMS E1 and HMS E9 spotted IV Squadron, but were too far away to attack them.

From 27 May to 4 July, Zähringen was back in the North Sea, patrolling the mouths of the Jade, Ems, and Elbe rivers. During this period, the naval high command realized that the old Wittelsbach-class ships would be useless in action against the Royal Navy, but could be effectively used against the much weaker Russian forces in the Baltic. As a result, the ships were transferred back to the Baltic in July, and they departed Kiel on the 7th, bound for Danzig. On 10 July, the ships proceeded further east to Neufahrwassar, along with VIII Torpedo-boat Flotilla. The IV Squadron ships sortied on 12 July to make a demonstration, returning to Danzig on 21 July without encountering Russian forces.

The following month, the naval high command began an operation against the Gulf of Riga in support of the Gorlice–Tarnów Offensive. The Baltic naval forces were reinforced with significant elements of the High Seas Fleet, including I Battle Squadron, I Scouting Group, II Scouting Group, and II Torpedo-boat Flotilla. Prince Heinrich planned that Schmidt's ships would force their way into the Gulf and destroy the Russian warships in Riga, while the heavy units of the High Seas Fleet would patrol to the north to prevent any of the main Russian Baltic Fleet that might try to interfere with the operation.

The Germans launched their attack on 8 August, initiating the Battle of the Gulf of Riga. Minesweepers attempted to clear a path through the Irbe Strait, covered by Braunschweig and Elsass, while Zähringen and the rest of the squadron remained outside the strait. The Russian battleship Slava attacked the Germans in the strait, forcing them to withdraw. During the action, the cruiser Thetis and the torpedo boat S144 were damaged by mines and the torpedo boats T52 and T58 were mined and sunk. Schmidt withdrew his ships to re-coal and Prince Heinrich debated making another attempt, as by that time it had become clear that the German Army's advance toward Riga had stalled. Nevertheless, Prince Heinrich decided to try to force the channel a second time, but now two dreadnought battleships from I Squadron would cover the minesweepers. Zähringen was instead left behind in Libau.

On 9 September, Zähringen and her four sisters sortied in an attempt to locate Russian warships off Gotland, but returned to port two days later without having engaged any opponents. Additionally, the threat from submarines in the Baltic convinced the German navy to withdraw the elderly Wittelsbach-class ships from active service. Zähringen and most of the other IV Squadron ships left Libau on 10 November, bound for Kiel; upon arrival the following day, they were designated the Reserve Division of the Baltic. The ships were anchored in Schilksee in Kiel. On 31 January 1916, the division was dissolved, and the ships were dispersed for subsidiary duties.

Zähringen was initially used as a training ship in Kiel. In 1917, the ship was used to train stokers but then became a target ship for torpedo boats and the old ironclad Württemberg, which had by that time become a torpedo training ship. Later, the Kaiserliche Marine considered replacing the cruiser Kaiserin Augusta, then the gunnery training ship, with Zähringen, and work began to refit her for this duty on 22 July 1918. The repairs and modifications had not been completed by the end of the war. The ship was left in Germany, and on 13 December was placed out of service.

=== Reichsmarine and Kriegsmarine ===
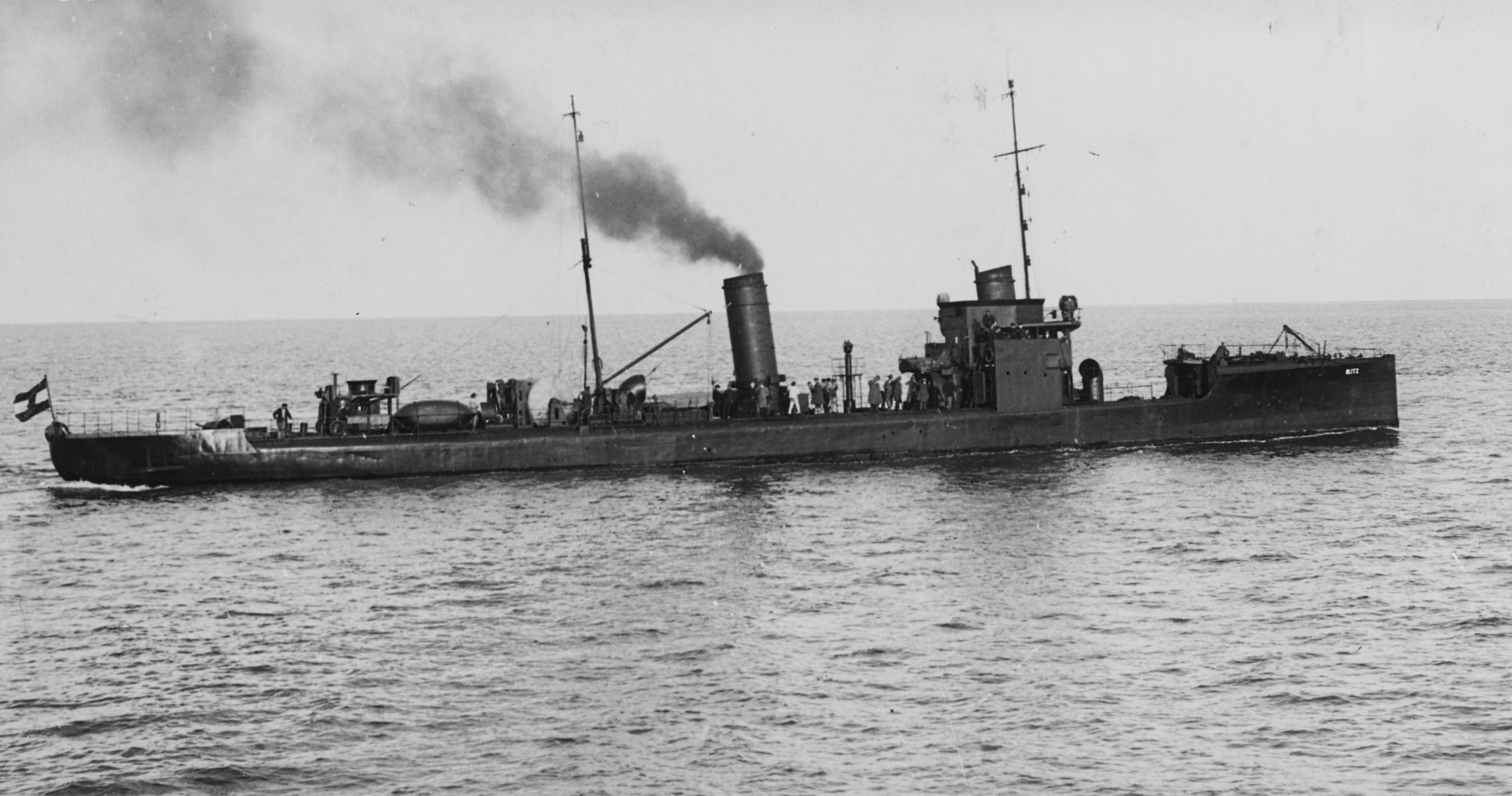
The first Blitz, c. 1928, the control vessel for Zähringen

According to Article 181 of the Treaty of Versailles, Zähringen and her sisters were to be demilitarized. (Note: Treaty of Versailles, Article 181.) This would permit the newly reorganized Reichsmarine to retain the vessels for auxiliary purposes. Zähringen was therefore stricken from the navy list on 11 March 1920 and disarmed. She was then used as a hulk in Wilhelmshaven until 1926. That year, the Reichsmarine decided to rebuild Zähringen into a radio-controlled target ship, similar to vessels operated by the Royal Navy and the United States Navy. The conversion work lasted through 1928.

The ship had her engine system overhauled; the three-shaft arrangement was replaced by a pair of 3-cylinder, vertical triple expansion engines. These were supplied with steam by two naval oil-fired, water-tube boilers. The system was designed to be operated remotely via wireless telegraph, with the receiver located deep inside the ship behind heavy armor protection so it would not be damaged by fire. The new propulsion system provided a top speed of 13.5 knots (25.0 km/h; 15.5 mph). The superstructure was also cut down, removing all extraneous structures, and the hull was extensively modified. The watertight subdivisions were significantly increased, openings in the hull were sealed, and the ship was filled with some 1,700 t (1,700 long tons; 1,900 short tons) of cork. When the conversion was completed, Zähringen displaced 11,800 metric tons (11,600 long tons). While not in use as a target, the ship was operated by a crew of 67. The torpedo boat S141 was converted for use as Zähringen's control vessel, and was renamed Blitz. She was later replaced by V185, which was also renamed Blitz.

Zähringen participated in her first gunfire training session on 8 August 1928, in a ceremony held for President Paul von Hindenburg. During the exercise, the old battleship Elsass fired at Zähringen. Over the course of the next sixteen years, she served as a target vessel for the Reichsmarine and then the Kriegsmarine of Nazi Germany, together with the old battleship Hessen. This period revealed that the addition of cork, meant to help keep the ship afloat in the event of a major hull breach, was a poor choice, as it caught fire easily. The modification of the ship's propulsion system also proved to be a mistake, as the ship's speed was too low, and it hindered her maneuverability. These experiences affected the conversion of Hessen, and neither mistake was repeated when that vessel was converted in the mid-1930s.

Zähringen continued on in service through World War II, initially based in Wilhelmshaven. Zähringen, Hessen, and their radio control boats were assigned to the Inspectorate of Naval Artillery on 1 August 1942. On 18 December 1944, the old ship was hit by bombs during an air raid on Gotenhafen and sank in shallow water. She was temporarily refloated and towed to the harbor entrance, where she was scuttled to block the port on 26 March 1945. The wreck was broken up in situ starting in 1949; work lasted until 1950.
