= Egernsund Bridge =

Coordinates: 54.9071°N 9.5992°E

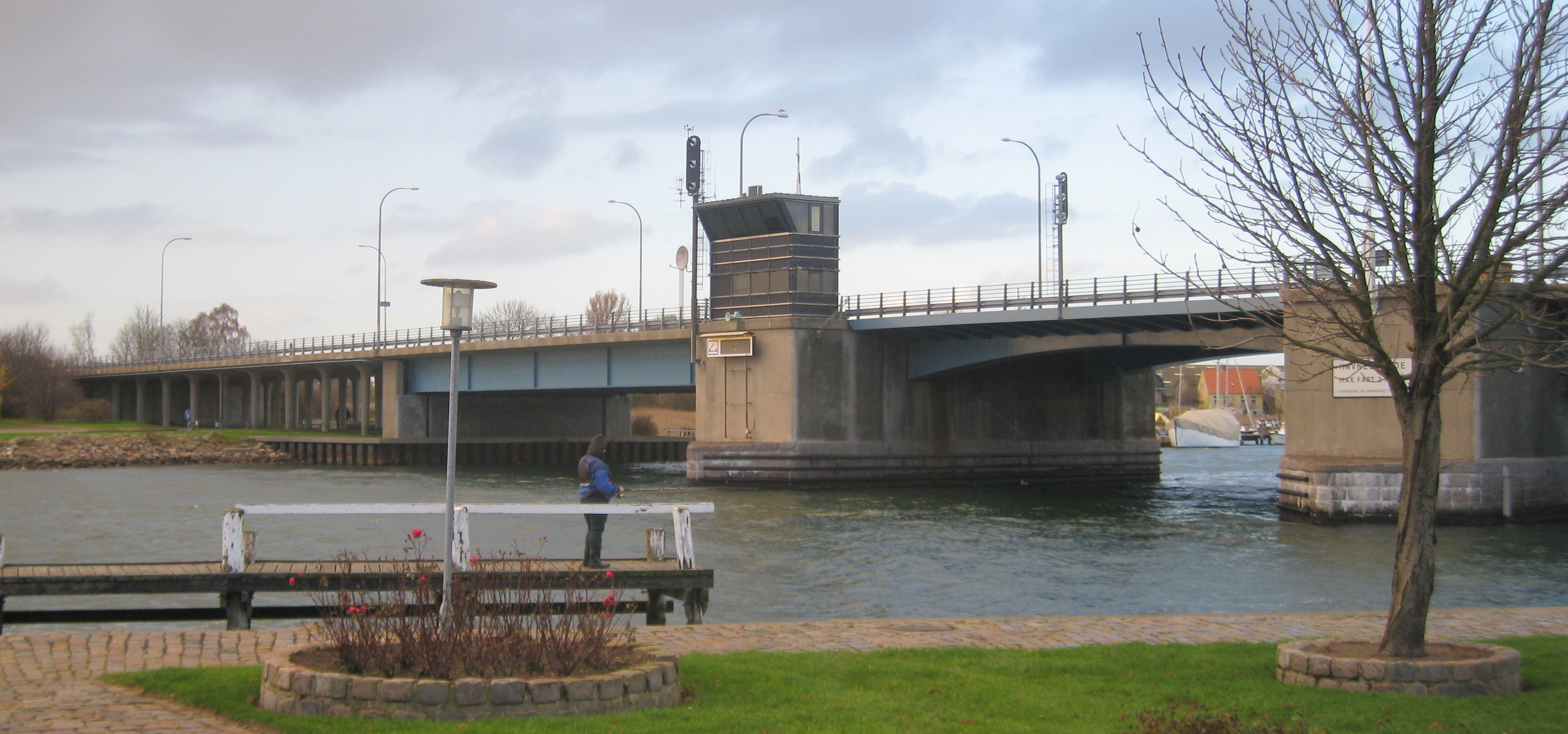
Egernsund Bridge seen from the harbor in Egernsund

Egernsund Bridge (Danish: Egernsundbroen) is a Danish bascule bridge that connects the towns of Alnor (in Gråsten) and Egernsund. The 240-metre long bridge was inaugurated in 1968.
