= Broager Church =

Coordinates: 54.8914°N 9.6742°E

- Broager Kirke
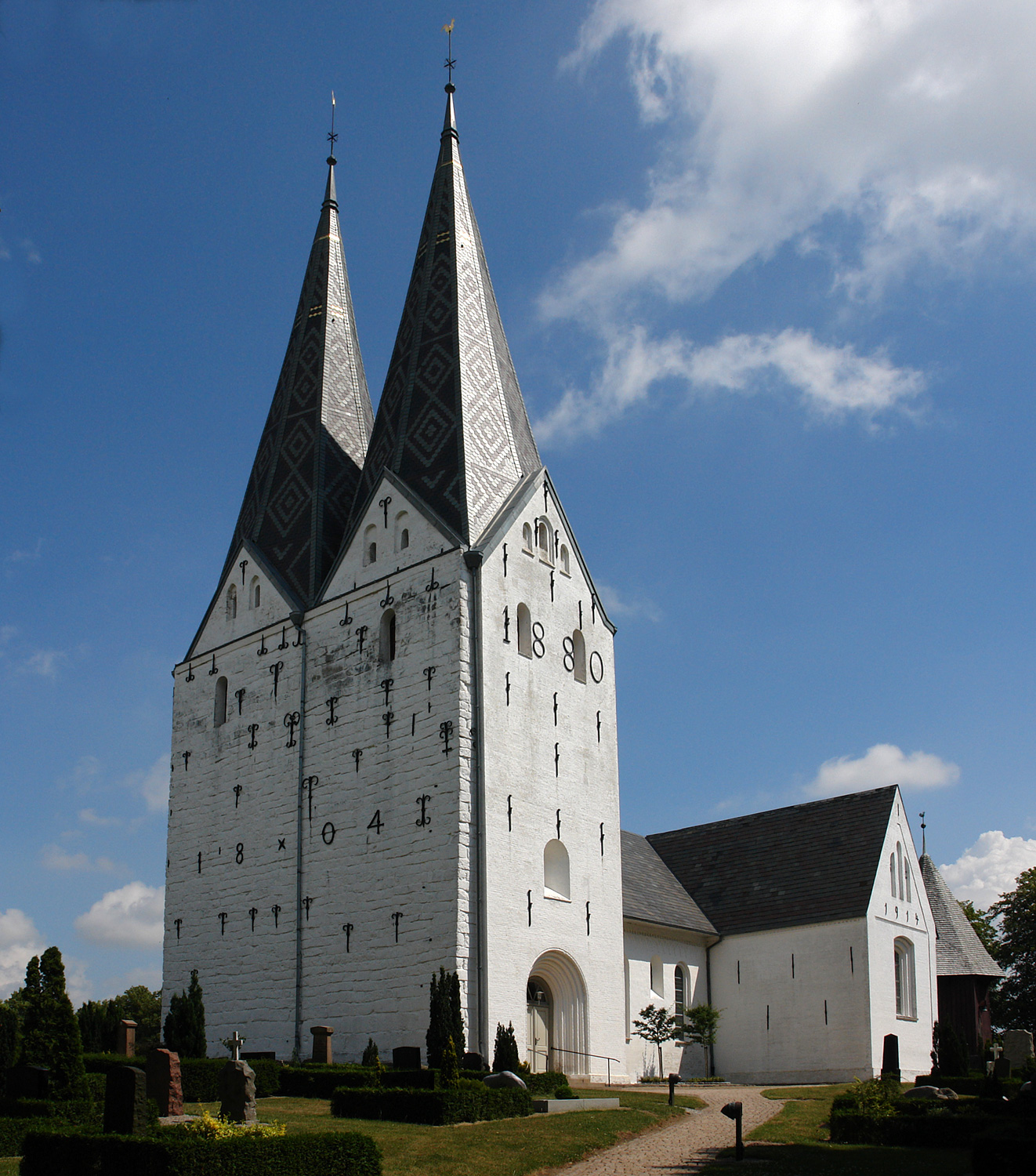
- Broager Church
- Location: Broager
- Country: Denmark
- Denomination: Church of Denmark

Administration
- Diocese: Haderslev
- Parish: Broager

Broager Church (Broager Kirke) is a church in the locality of Broager, Denmark.

== History ==
The original construction dates from about 1209. The chapel and vestry are Gothic-style, and the whole church is built of brick. The churchyard has the tallest wooden bell tower in Denmark, which dates back to 1650.

Restoration of the church in 1924-27 revealed frescoes from different periods: Romanesque, from the beginning of the 13th century; late-Gothic, from about 1500; and Renaissance from 1587. The chapel's murals depict the legend of Saint George and the Dragon and his martyrdom. Along with the late medieval, carved, wooden figure of the dragon slayer from approximately 1490, these paintings form the setting for the chapel's Saint George cult. In the late 1990s, restoration was done in collaboration with the architects Hans Lund and Alan Havsteen-Mikkelsen (1938–2002).

Dating from 1717, the altarpiece was made by Dutch artist Anthon Günther Lundt. The style is Baroque with acanthus foliage. The pulpit is Renaissance from 1591 made at one of the fine local joiner-workshops in Flensburg. The crucifix, from approximately 1250, is a mixture type between Late Romanesque and early Gothic. The baptismal font origins from the first building period of the church together with the communion table. The font is composed of two types of granite—a reddish basin upon a greyish foot. Upon the foot are four carved male heads: two with pageboy haircuts and no beard, and two with center parting and beard. The lid of the font is a wooden crown from 1787. The baptismal basin is of brass and dates from the same period.

== Gallery ==
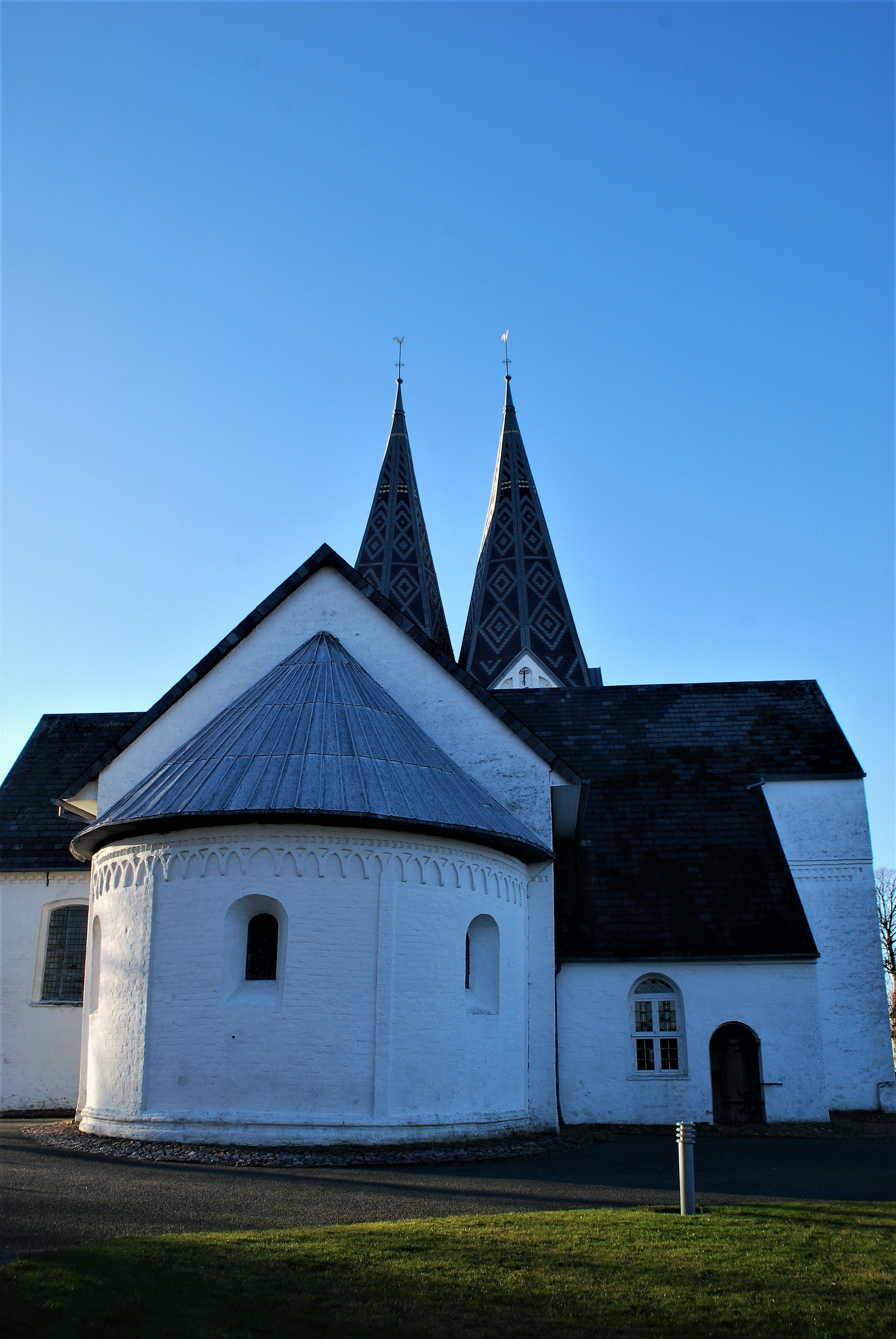
Broager Church

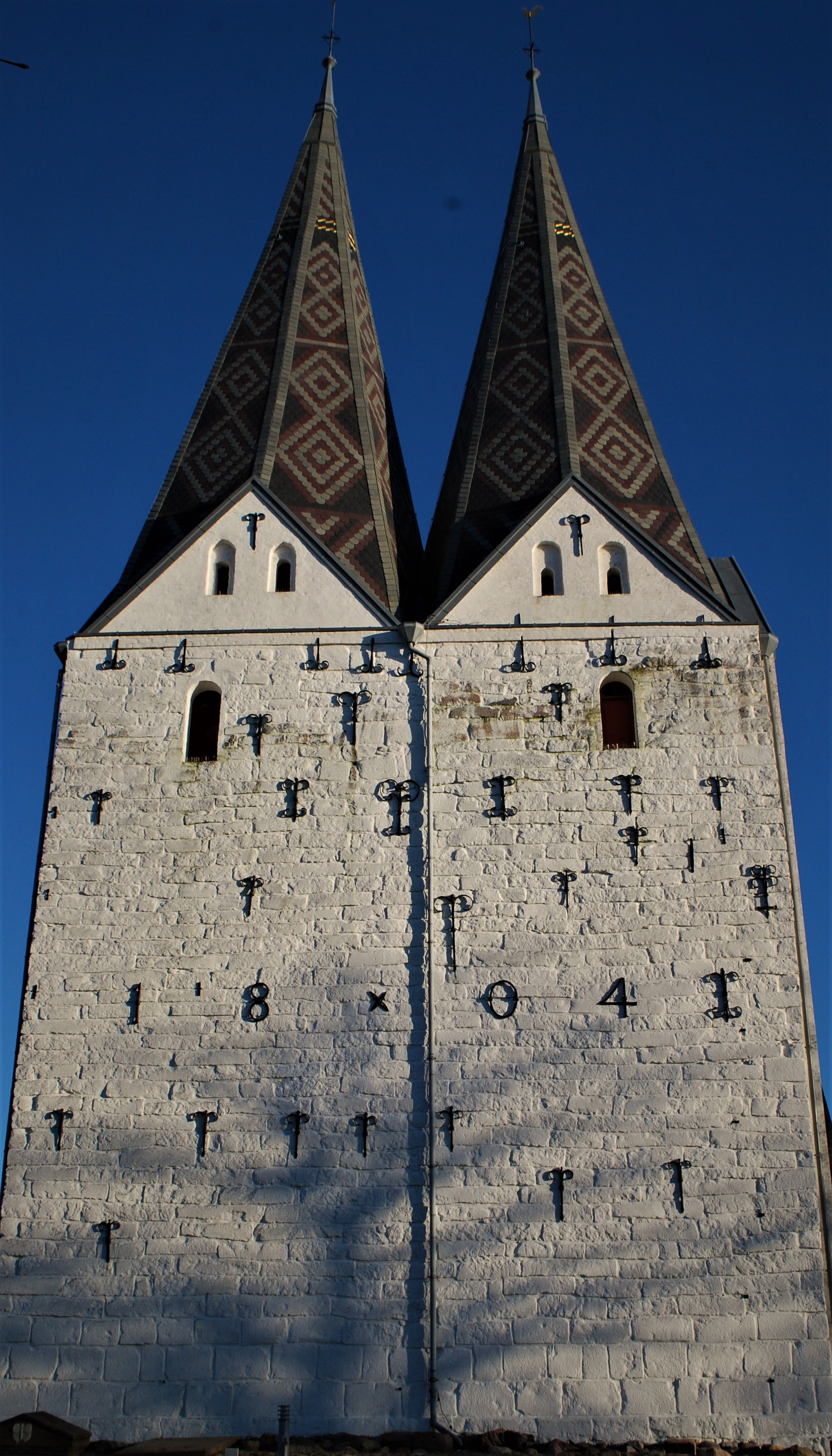
Denmark's only village church with 2 spires

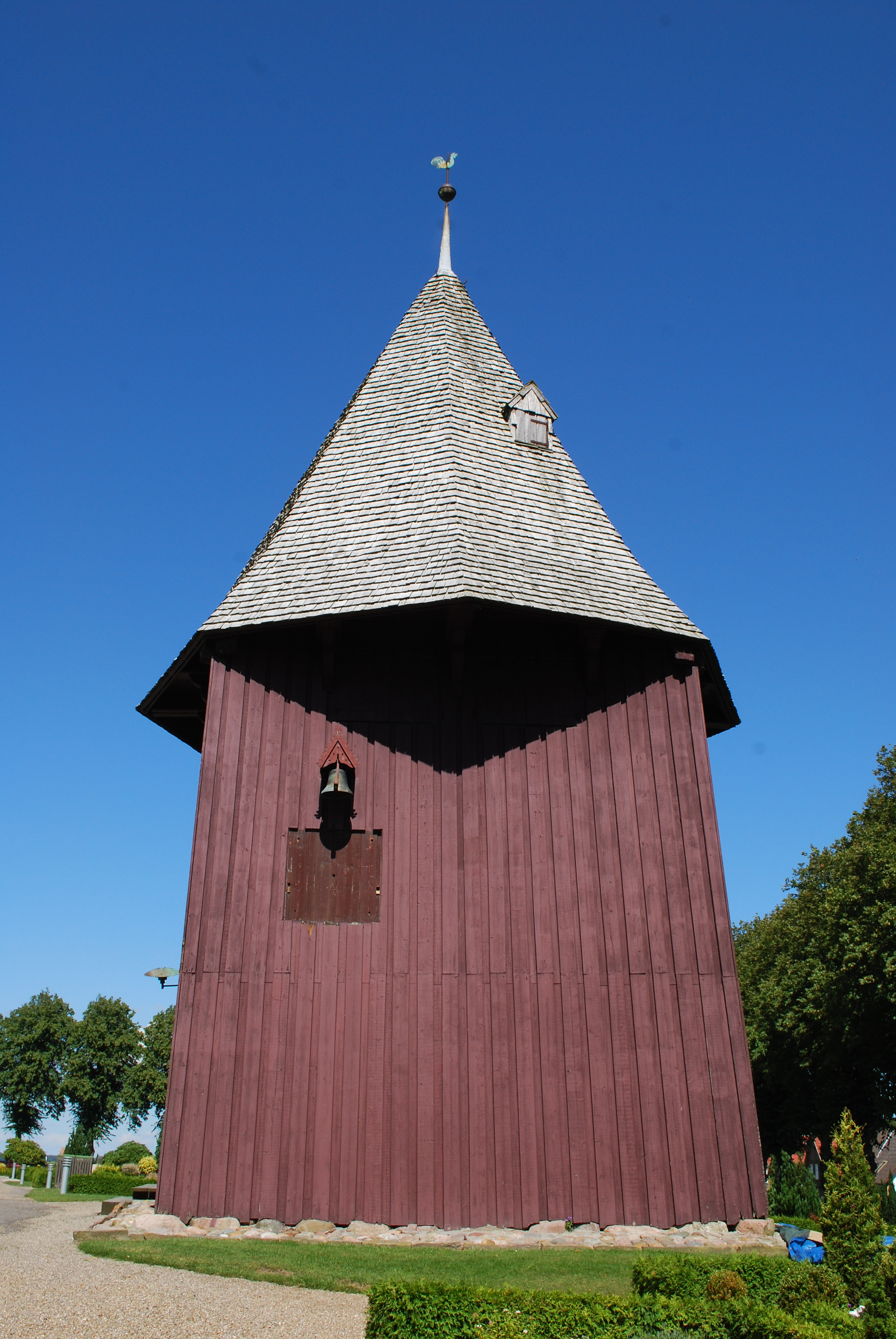
Clockhouse

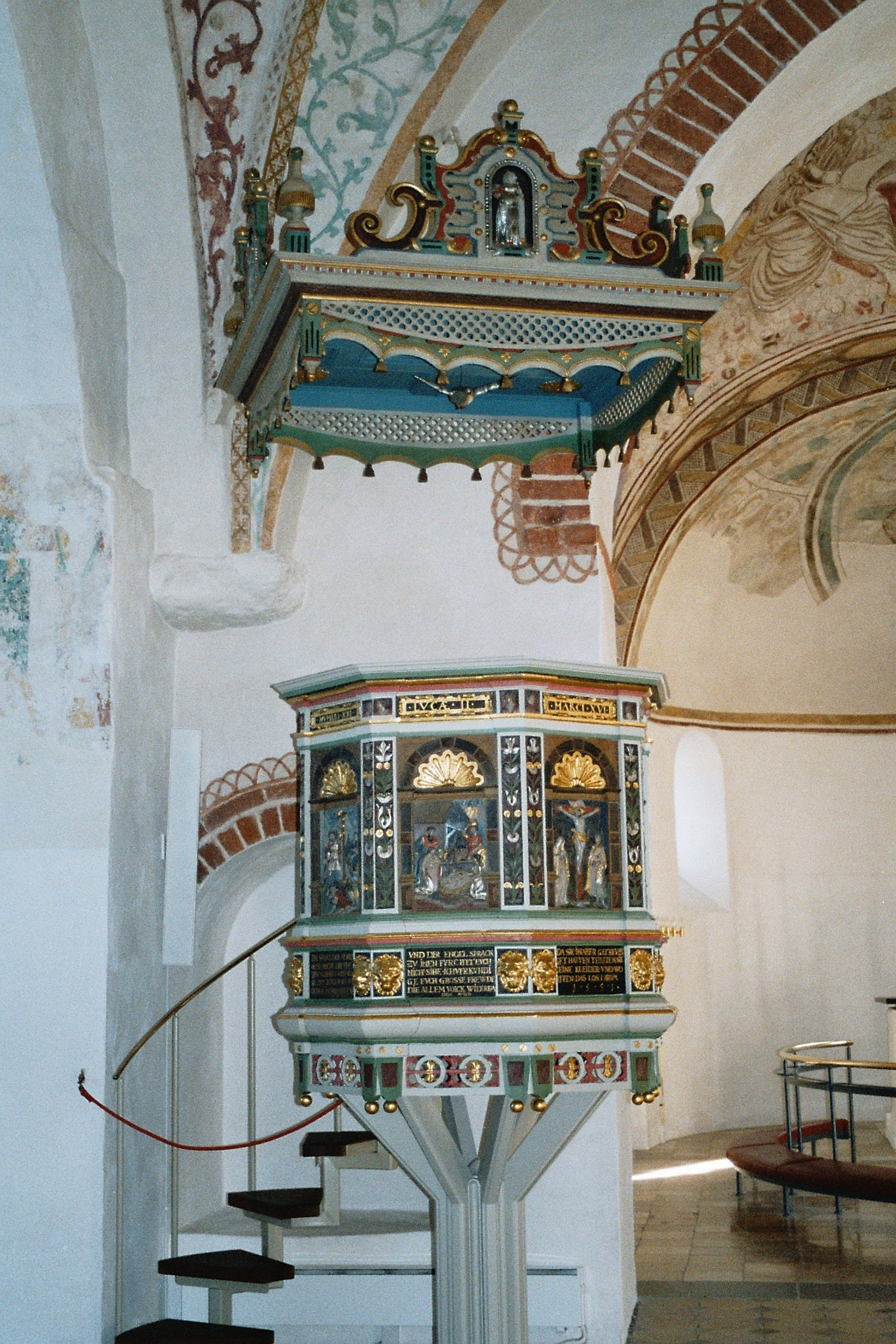
Pulpit

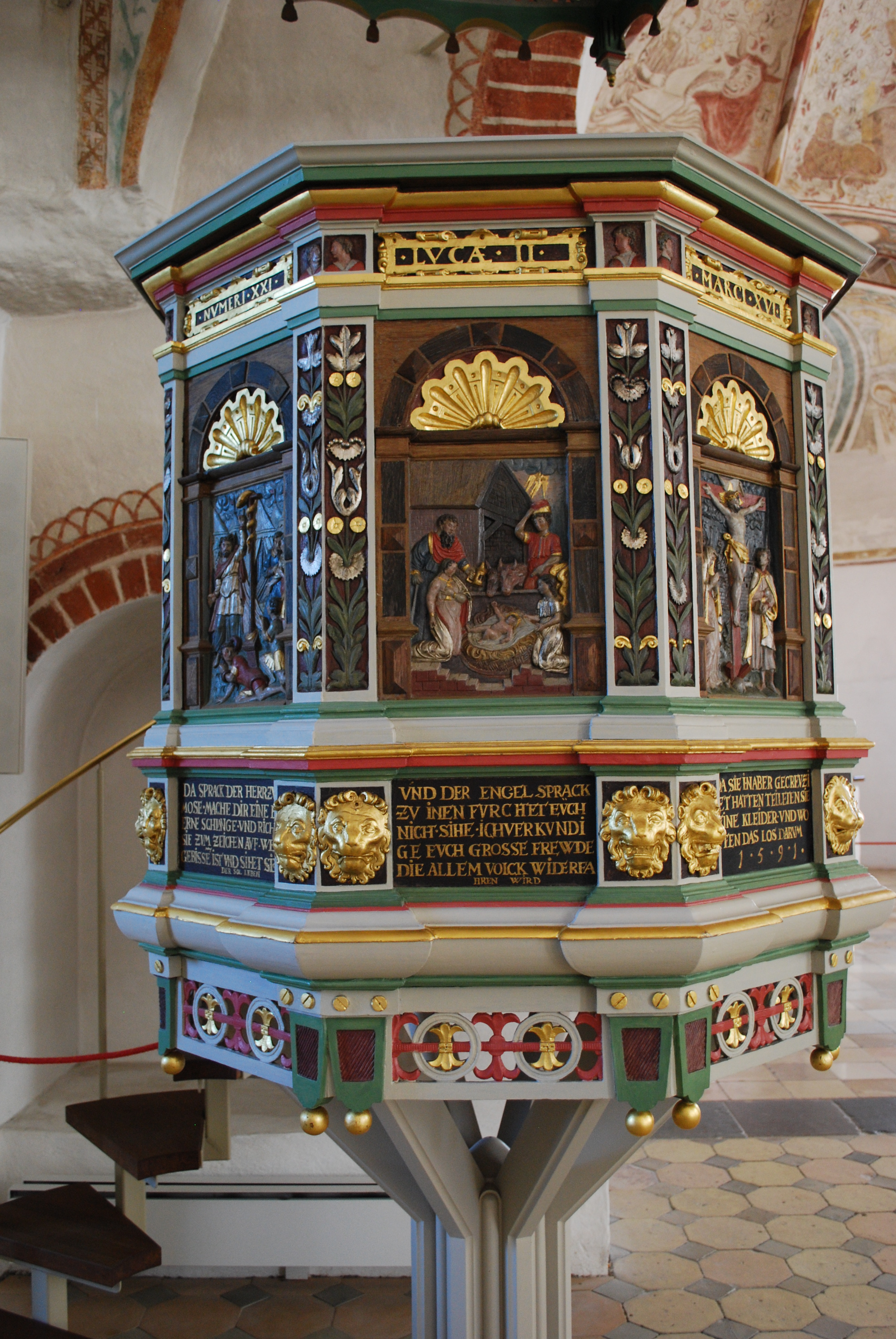
Closeup of Pulpit

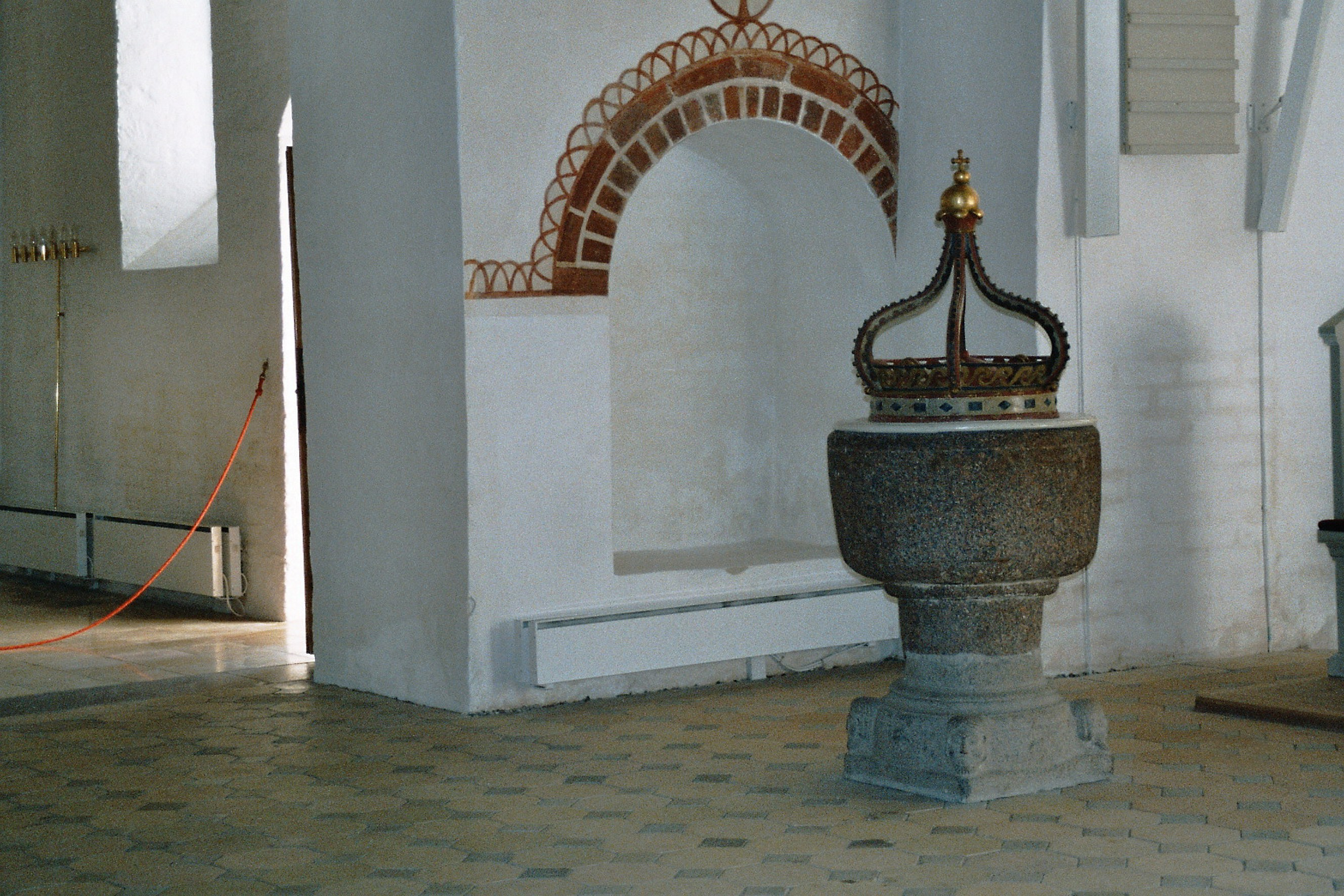
Baptismal font

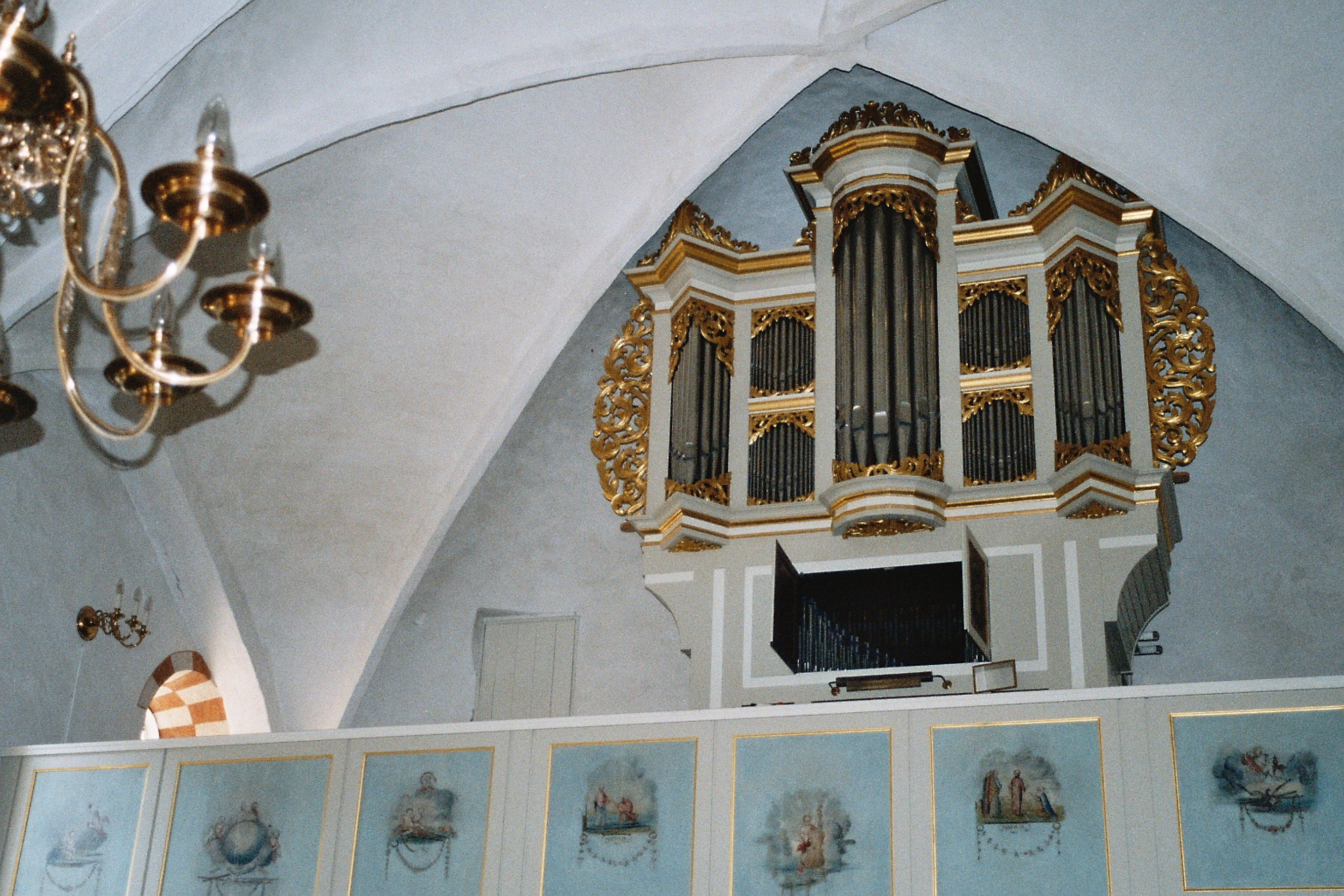
Organ

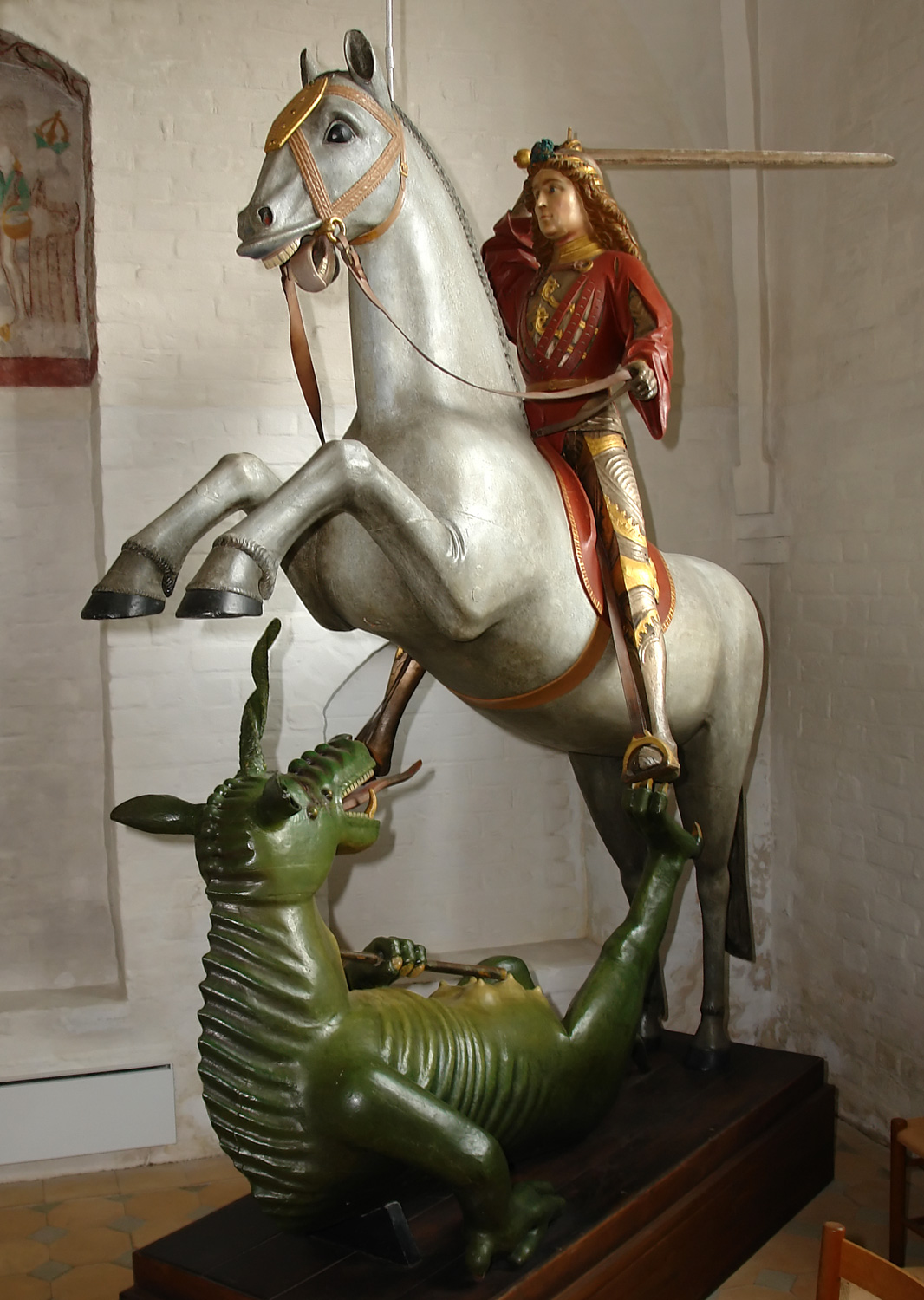
Saint George and the Dragon
