= Broager =

- Town
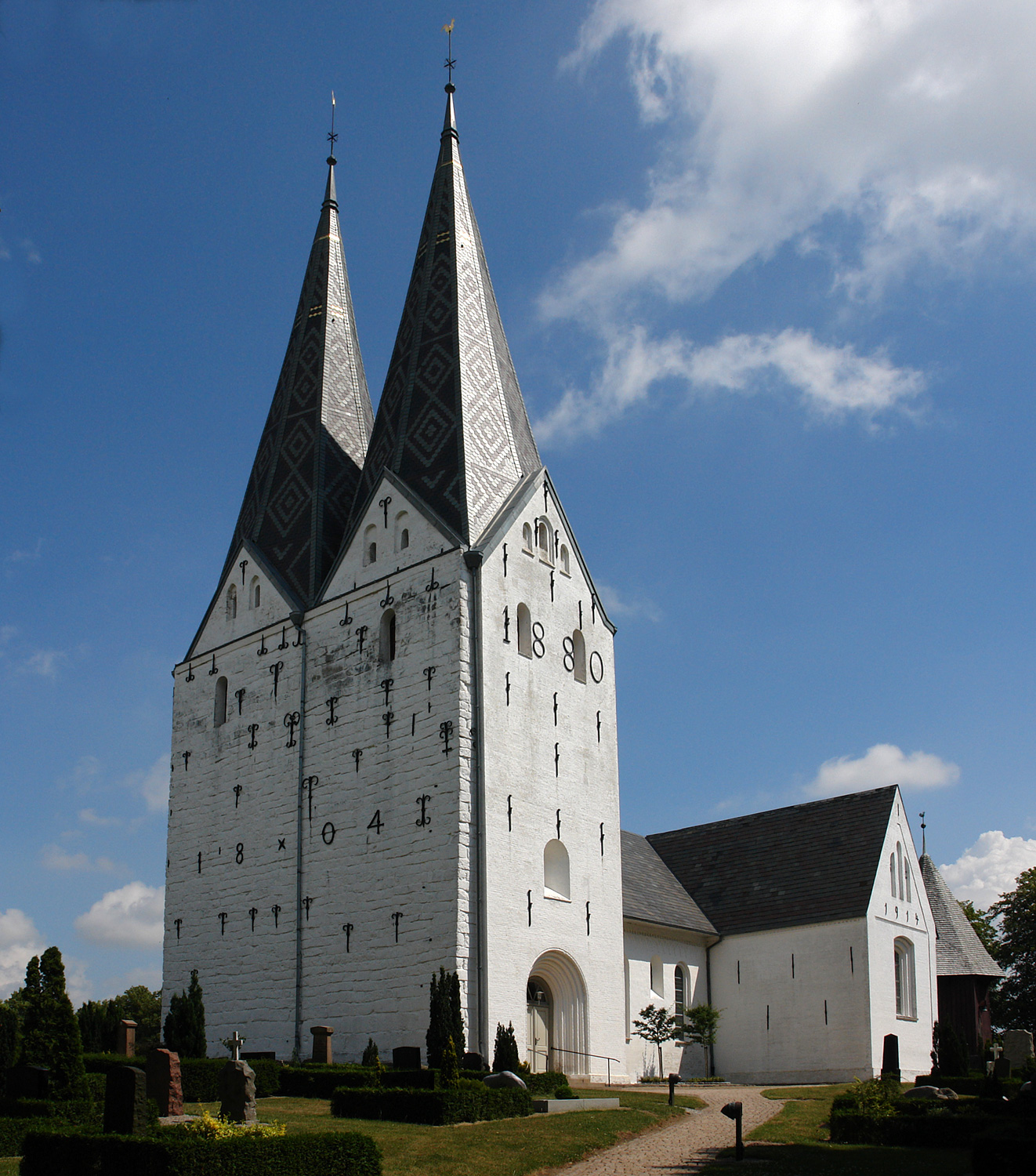
- Broager Church

- Location in Denmark Broager (Region of Southern Denmark)
- Coordinates: 54°53′20″N 9°40′29″E
- Country: Denmark
- Region: Southern Denmark
- Municipality: Sønderborg

Area
  - Urban: 1.92 km^{2} (0.74 sq mi)

Population (2026)
  - Urban: 3,202
  - Urban density: 1,670/km^{2} (4,320/sq mi)
  - Gender: 1,580 males and 1,622 females
- Time zone: UTC+1 (CET)
  - Summer (DST): UTC+2 (CEST)
- Postal code: DK-6310 Broager

Broager (Danish pronunciation: [ˈpʁoˌɛˀjɐ]; German: Broacker, South Jutlandic: Braue) is a town with a population of 3,202 (1 January 2026) in Sønderborg Municipality in Region of Southern Denmark, Denmark. It lies on the Broager Peninsula and is therefore surrounded by water on three sides, the waters of Flensborg Fjord leading into the Baltic Sea. The town of Broager lies in the middle of the peninsula by a major road, which leads to the Egernsund Bridge, which crosses over the Egern Strait to the Jutland mainland. The town's two-towered church is its most important landmark.

The town was part of Broager Municipality until 2007 when it became part of the larger Sønderborg Municipality.

== Notable people ==
- Ludvig Harboe (1709 in Broager – 1783) a Danish theologian and bishop.
- Peter Jebsen (1824 in Broager – 1892) a Norwegian businessperson and politician, founded the Dale of Norway, a clothing brand of high quality knitwear
