= Broager Peninsula =

Peninsula in Denmark

Native name: Broagerland
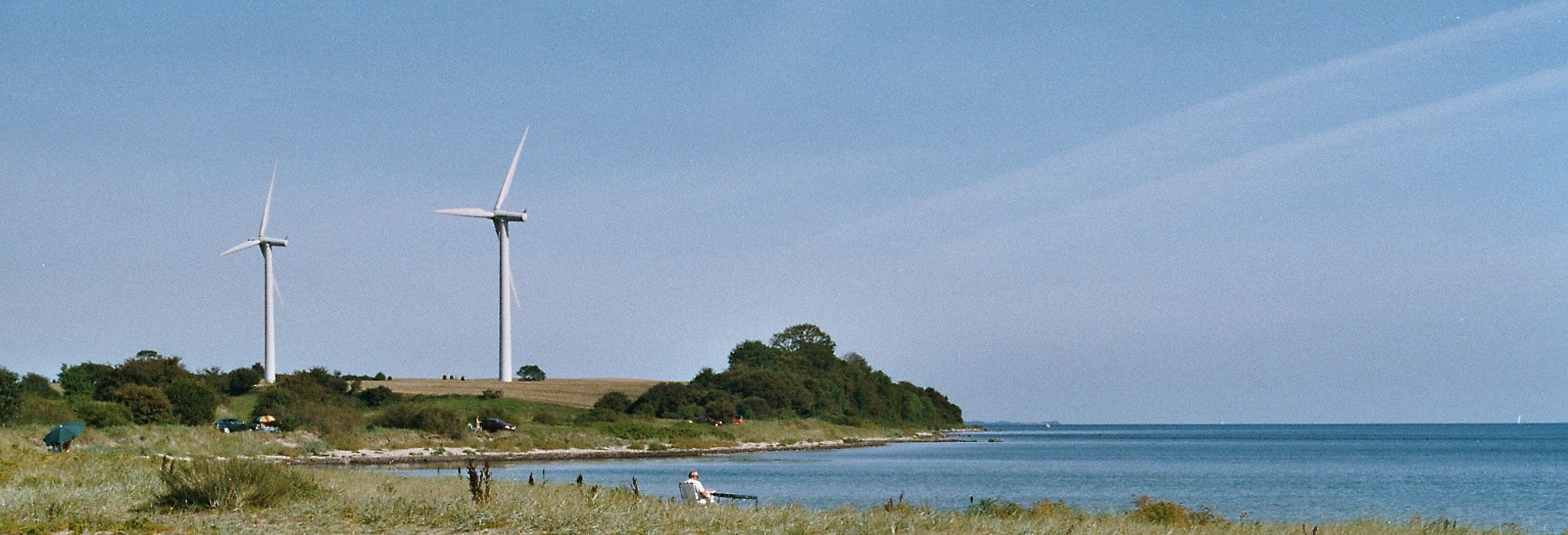
- The southernmost point of the Broager Peninsula

- Location within Denmark

Geography
- Coordinates: 54°52′30″N 9°41′00″E
- Area: 43.38 km^{2} (16.75 sq mi)

Administration
- Denmark

Demographics
- Population: 6,203

Broager Peninsula (Danish: Broagerland) is a peninsula and cultural region in southern Denmark. The peninsula consists entirely of the former Broager Municipality. The peninsula has an area of 43,38 km² and a population of 6,203. The namesake, and largest town of the peninsula is Broager.
