= Western use of the swastika in the early 20th century =

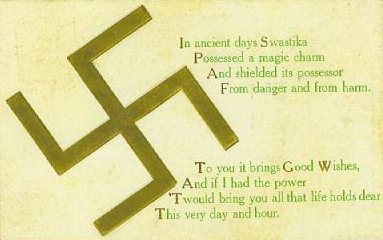
American postcard mailed to Fair Haven, Connecticut, from Rochester, New York, in June 1910. This card was among those produced by the Stanford Card Co. in Brooklyn, New York.

The swastika (Sanskrit: स्वस्तिक) is an ancient symbol used by many cultures and religions in Eurasia that generally takes the shape of an equilateral cross with four legs, each bent at 90 degrees in either right-facing (卐) form or left-facing (卍) form. For millennia, it has been considered a sacred and auspicious symbol in the Indian religions, including Hinduism, Buddhism, and Jainism. Depictions of this shape date back at least 11,000 years.

In the Western world, the symbol (also called gammadion or fylfot) became a popular sign of luck in the early 20th century—as it had long been in the Eastern world—and was often used for ornamentation. However, after it was adopted by the Nazi Party in the 1920s and subsequently displayed across Germany and German-occupied Europe before and during World War II, the symbol's usage outside of Nazism and neo-Nazism faded. Many Western countries and some non-Western countries have since banned the swastika through legislation targeting Nazi symbols for suppression, although there are exemptions for displays in historical and religious contexts.

== Background ==
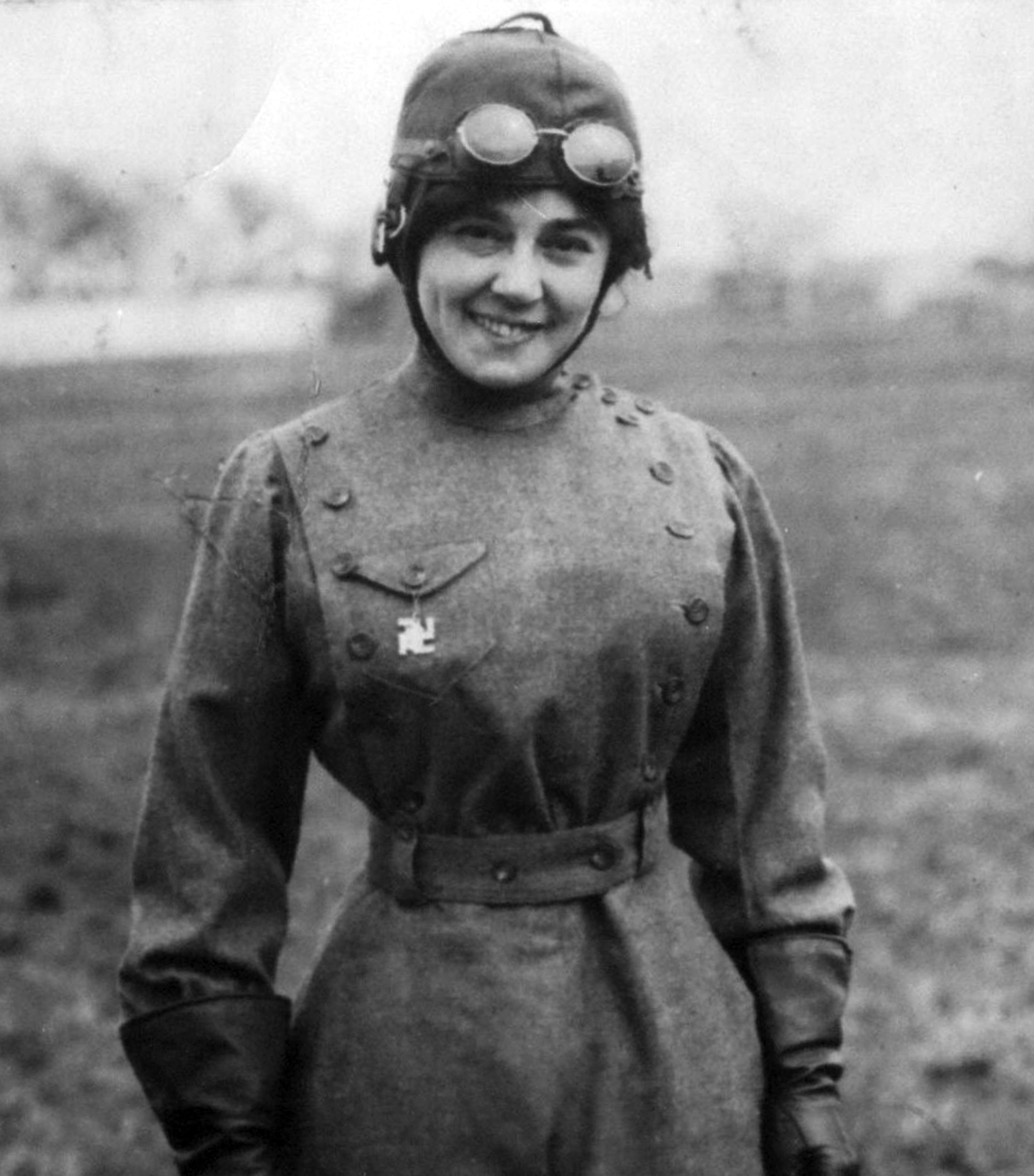
American pioneer aviator Matilde Josephine Moisant wearing a swastika medallion on her uniform in 1912. The symbol was popular as a good-luck charm with early aviators.

The discovery of the Indo-European language group in the 1790s led to a great effort by European archaeologists to link the pre-history of European people to the hypothesised ancient "Aryans" (variously referring to the Indo-Iranians or the Proto-Indo-Europeans). Following his discovery of objects bearing the swastika square in the ruins of the Greek city of Troy, German archaeologist Heinrich Schliemann consulted two leading Sanskrit scholars of the day: French linguist Émile-Louis Burnouf and German-British linguist Friedrich Max Müller. Schliemann concluded that the swastika square was a specifically Indo-European symbol, and associated it with the ancient Proto-Indo-European migrations. He connected it with similar shapes found on ancient pots in Germany, and theorised that the swastika square was a "significant religious symbol of our remote ancestors"—linking Germanic, Greek, and Indo-Iranian cultures. Later discoveries of the motif among the remains of the Hittites and of ancient Iran seemed to confirm this theory, but the symbol was also known for its use by indigenous Americans as well as other unrelated Eastern cultures.

The originally Sanskrit word "swastika" was absorbed into English in the late 19th century.

By the early 20th century it was used worldwide and was regarded as a symbol of good luck. The swastika's worldwide use was well documented in an 1894 publication by the Smithsonian. The symbol appeared in many popular, non-political Western designs from the 1880s to the 1920s, with occasional use continuing into the 1930s.

Western use of the motif was subverted in the early 20th century after it was adopted by the Nazi Party and displayed on the contemporary flag of Germany. The swastika was used as a conveniently eye-catching symbol to emphasise the so-called Aryan–German correspondence and instill racial pride. Since World War II, most Westerners have known the swastika almost exclusively as a Nazi symbol, leading to confusion about its sacred religious and historical status in Asia and parts of Europe.

== Europe ==
=== Denmark ===
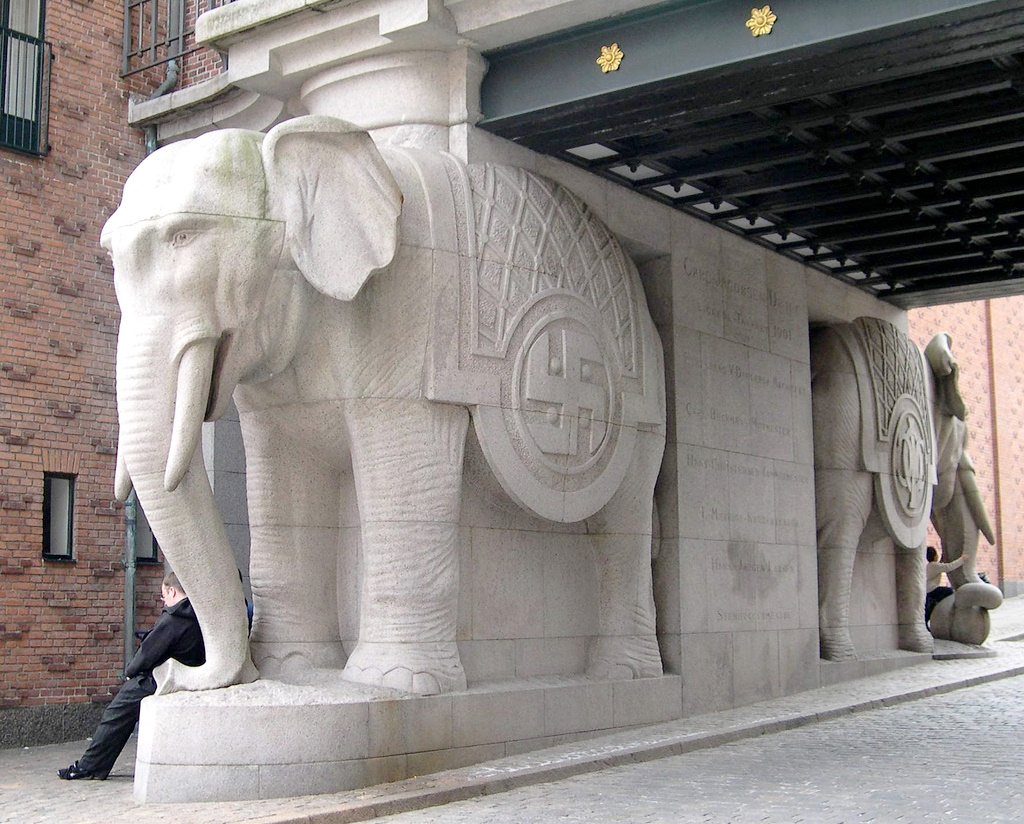
The Elephant Gate entrance at Carlsberg Brewery in Copenhagen, Denmark, decorated with the company's early swastika logo

The Danish brewery company Carlsberg Group used the swastika as a logo from the 19th century until the middle of the 1930s, when it was discontinued because of association with the Nazi Party in neighbouring Germany. However, the swastika carved on elephants at the entrance gates of the company's headquarters in Copenhagen in 1901 can still be seen today.

=== Finland ===
In Finland, the swastika (Finnish: hakaristi) was used as the official national marking of the Finnish Air Force between 1918 and 1945, anti-aircraft troops as a part of the air force, and tank troops at that time.

Its origin is unrelated to Nazis. In March 1918 during the Finnish Civil War a Swedish count Eric von Rosen (who was not a Nazi in 1918 yet) gave the Finnish Whites an aircraft. The aircraft was marked with von Rosen's badge, a blue swastika on a white background. The Finnish Air Force adopted this roundel as their national insignia.

The swastika was also used by the Lotta Svärd organisation, a Finnish paramilitary organisation for women, which was dissolved in 1944 according to the terms of the Moscow Armistice.

Variations of the tursaansydän symbol

The tursaansydän, an elaboration on the swastika, is used by scouts in some instances and by a student organization. The Finnish village of Tursa uses the tursaansydän as a kind of a certificate of authenticity on products made there, and is the origin of this name of the symbol (meaning 'heart of Tursa'), which is also known as the mursunsydän ('walrus-heart'). Traditional textiles are still made in Finland with swastikas as parts of traditional ornaments.

The Finnish Airforce units still wear a swastika on their colours. In addition, the shoulder insignia of the Airforce Headquarters bears a swastika design. In 1945, the Air Force changed its national emblem to a roundel, but the use of swastika in some other insignia was continued. In 1958, the President of Finland Urho Kekkonen inaugurated the colours of the Air Force units which feature a swastika design. The latest colour of this pattern was inaugurated by president Tarja Halonen 25 October 2005 for the newly formed Air Force Academy. Also the Utti Jaeger Regiment, responsible for training special forces, bears a swastika-like emblem (sun cross) on its colour. In January 2017, the Air Force Command replaced its emblem, which had contained a swastika, with a design reminiscent of the Air Force service emblem; a golden eagle and a circle of wings.

The swastika has not disappeared in Finnish medals and decorations. The decorations of the Order of the Cross of Liberty, designed by Akseli Gallen-Kallela – who also designed the emblem of the Finnish Air Force and the Finnish flight mark in 1918 – bears a swastika laid on a George's Cross. The President of Finland uses a Cross of Liberty in the personal flag. However, in the flag is only the 3rd Cross of Liberty, although the highest Finnish decoration is the Grand Cross of the White Rose of Finland with Collar. During the Continuation War and immediately after the wars, 191 soldiers were appointed Knights of the Mannerheim Cross.

In December 2007, a silver replica of the World War II -period Finnish air defence's relief ring decorated with a swastika became available as a part of a charity campaign. The original war-time idea was that the public swap their precious metal rings for the state air defence's relief ring, made of iron.

Blue swastika insignia as well as black swastika emblem of the Finnish Air Force (1918–1945)

Finnish Air Force flight mark (1918–1945)

Black fylfot variant used as marking for Finnish military vehicles (tank troops) during WWII

Blue color version at fylfot used as marking for Finnish military vehicles (tank troops) during WWII

Old troop department emblem of the Air Force Academy of Finland

Flag of the Air Force Academy

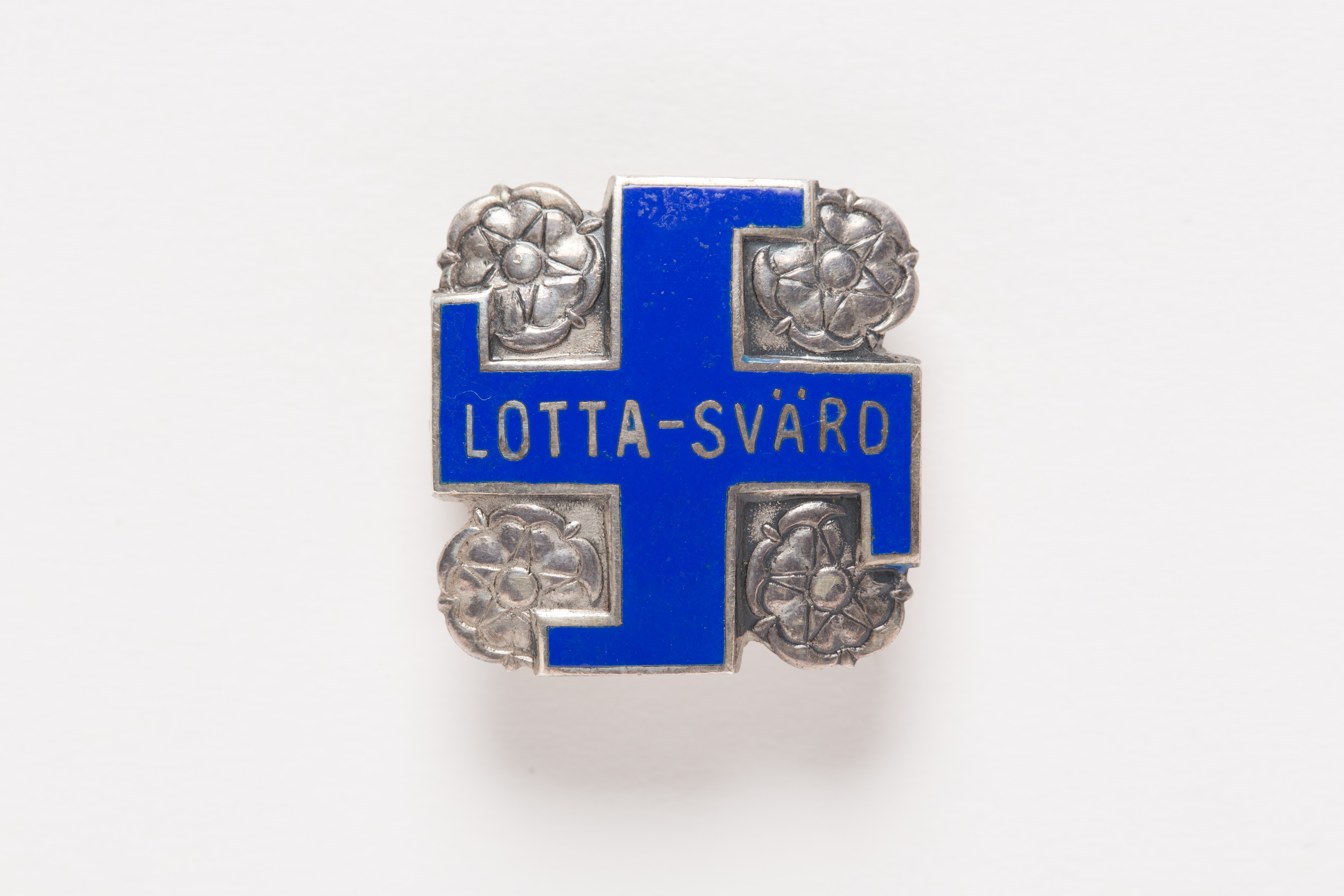
Lotta Svärd badge (1920–1944)

Flag of the President of Finland

=== France ===
In 1917, René Croste identified the swastika and the Basque lauburu. The tourism industry and promoters of Basque culture in the French Basque Country used both for souvenirs and general Basque symbolism. In 1935, the Musée Basque of Bayonne asked to avoid the swastika for its Nazi association and use the lauburu. It was however contested by Ph. Aranart who saw both as Christian crosses. The success of the campaign was not total and the German occupiers of the French Basque Country were surprised to find swastikas in tombs, frontons, and houses. Basque collaborationists attempted to take advantage of the similarity. After the Second World War, the swastika was not considered a Basque symbol any more.

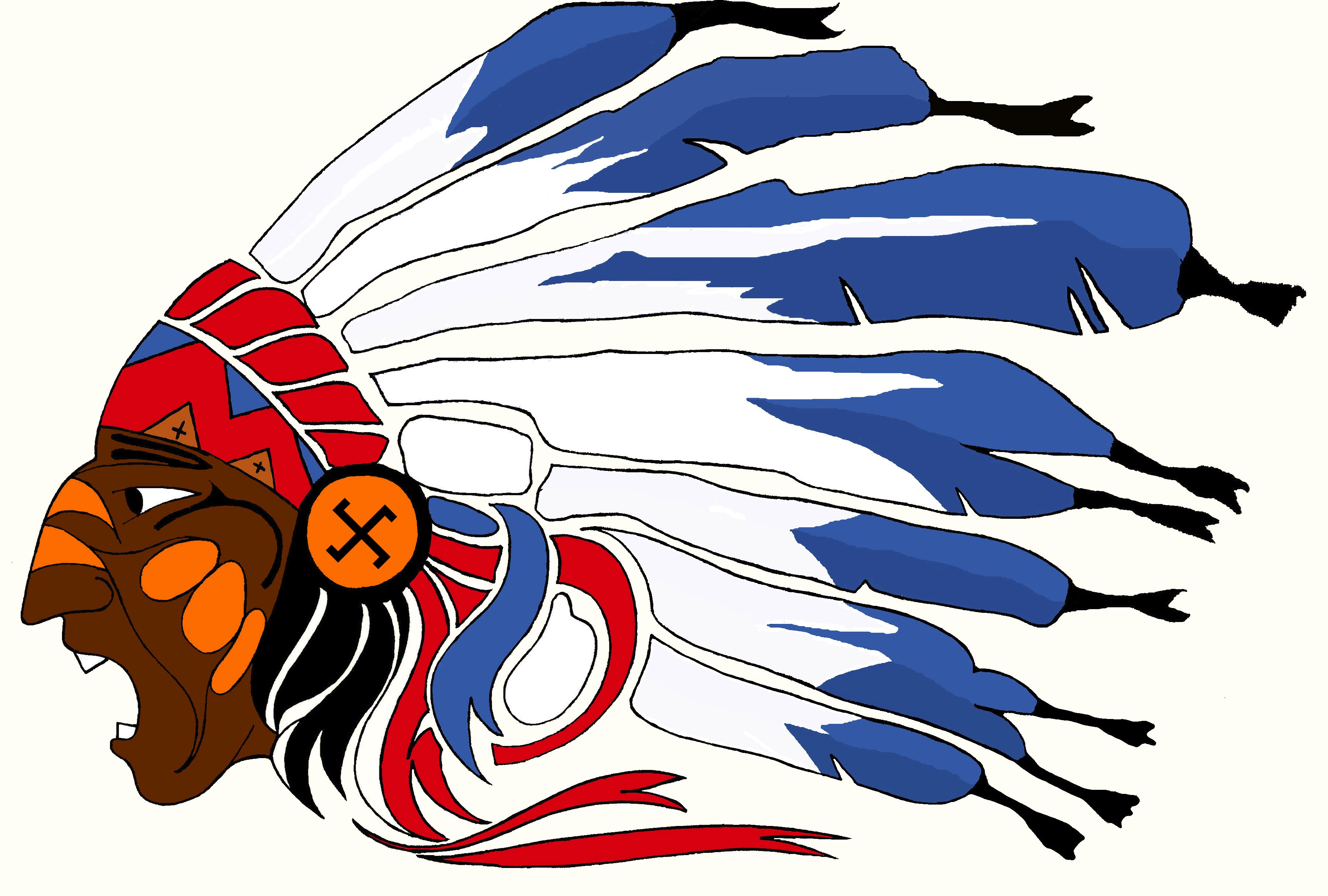
Swastika on the emblem of the Lafayette Escadrille

=== Germany ===
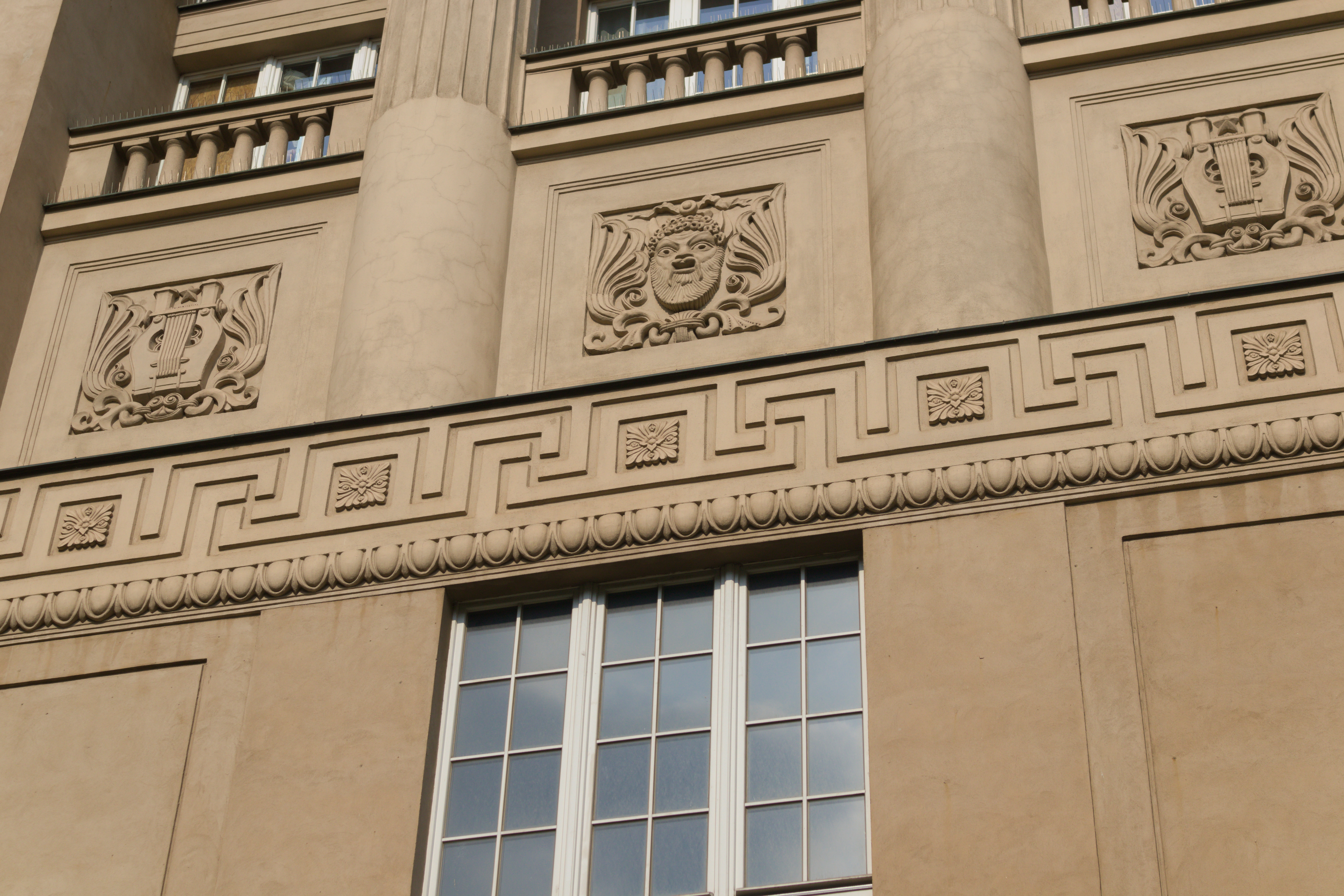
Swastika pattern in the stonework of the Grand Theatre, Poznań, constructed in from 1908-09 in the Province of Posen, German Empire, now Poland.

The Swastika saw use by nationalist movements before the Nazis emerged into prominence. It was the battle sign of the Reich Hammer League, that was founded in 1912 by Theodor Fritsch. Ferdinand Werner's German Folkish Party (Deutschvölkische Partei), an antisemitic and Völkisch entity started using the swastika for its party publication German Folkish Paper (Deutschvölkische Blätter) in January 1917.

The Bundesarchiv has photos from the 1920 Kapp Putsch showing Marinebrigade Ehrhardt Freikorps using the symbol, however, it was not the most important symbol of the putschists.

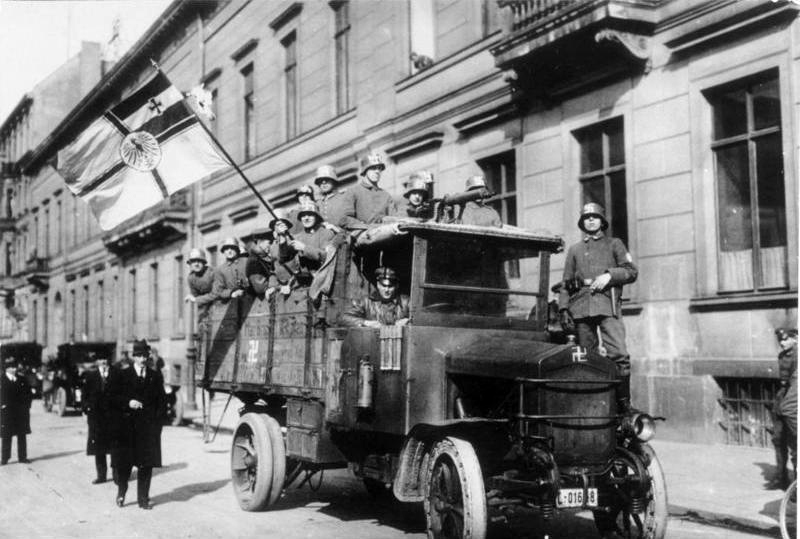
Swastikas on helmets and trucks during the Kapp Putsch

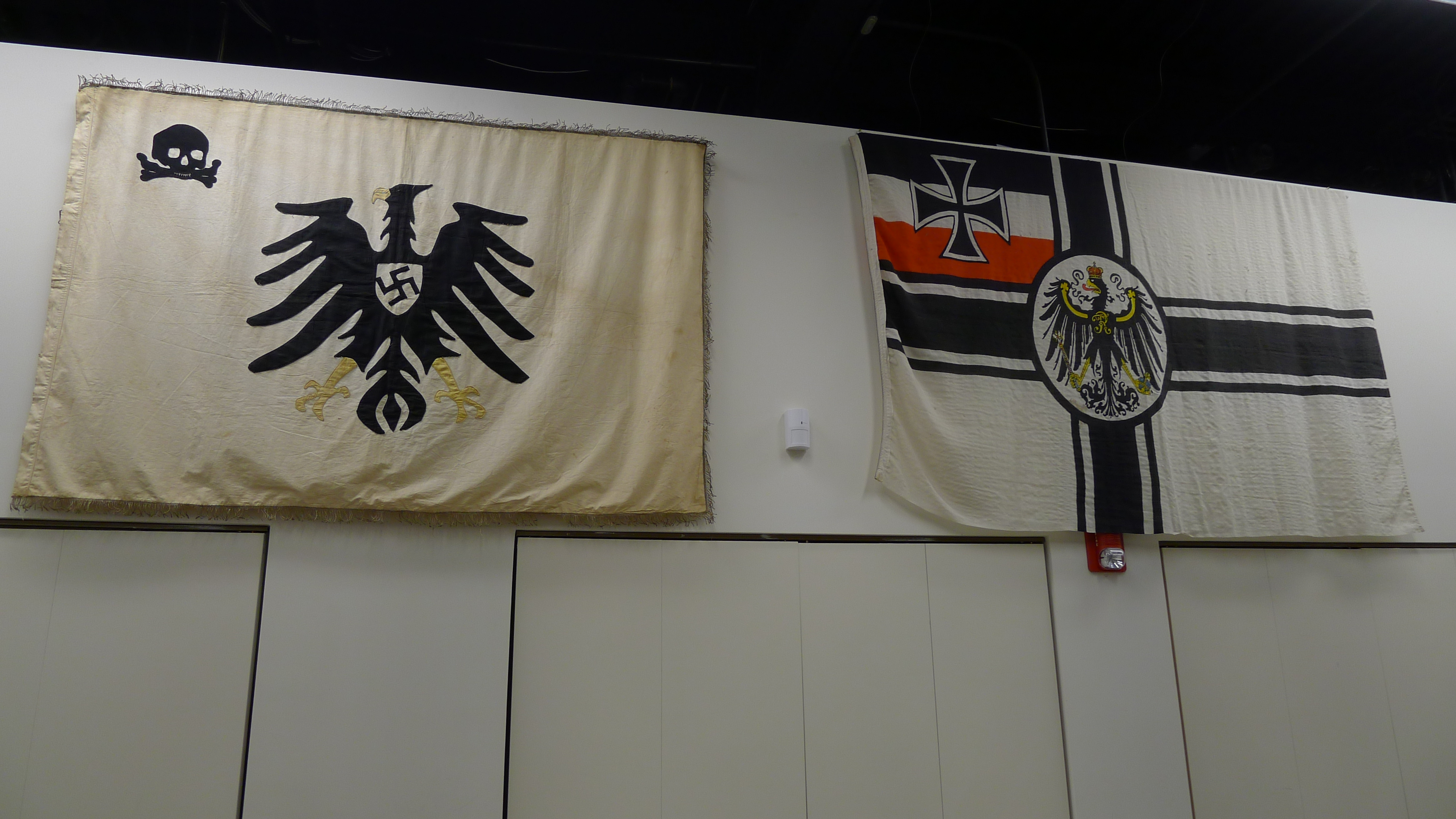
Freikorps flag next to German Imperial War Ensign in Boston World War II Museum

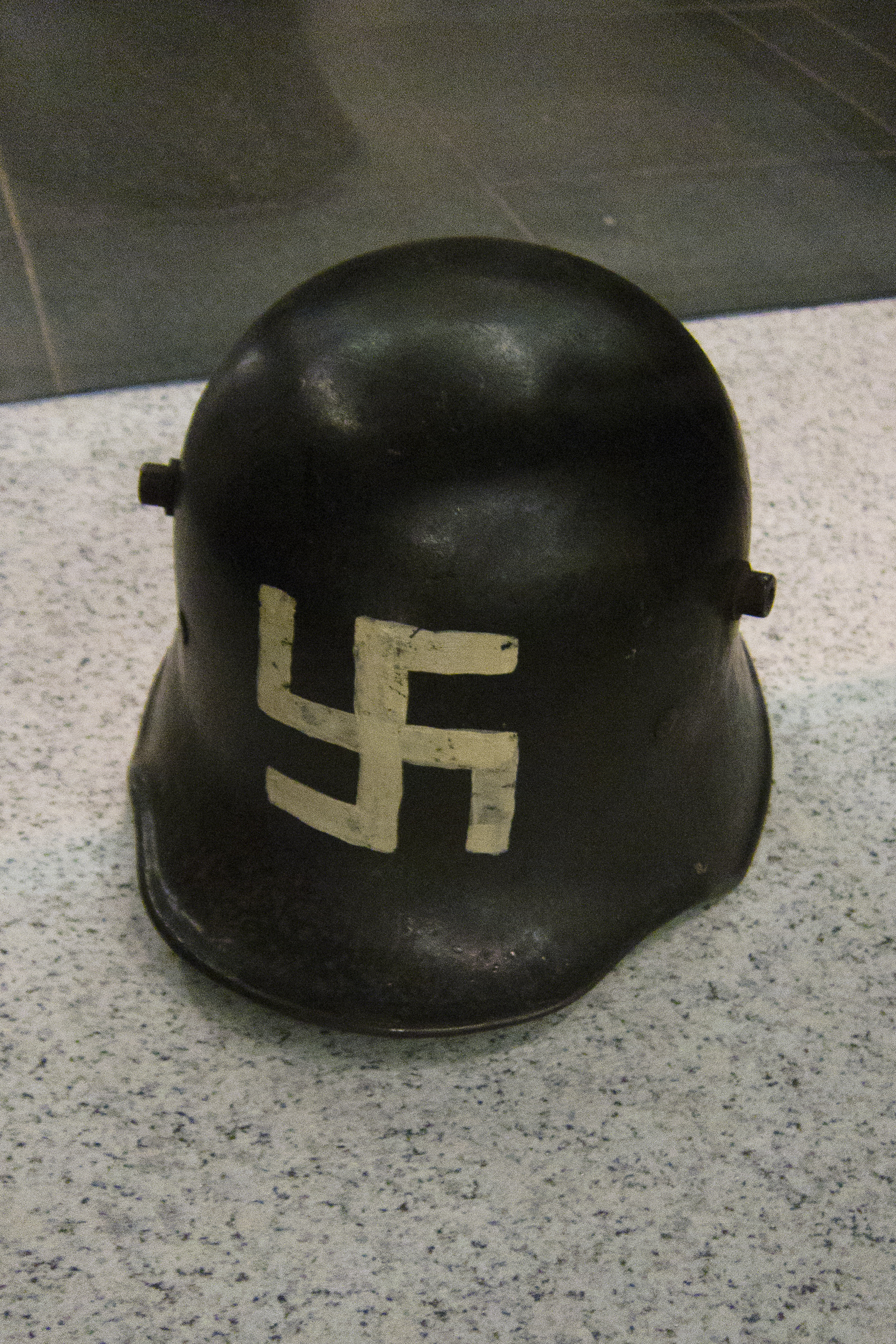
German World War I helmet with swastika used by a member of the Marinebrigade Ehrhardt, a right-wing paramilitary Free Corps, participating in the Kapp Putsch 1920

=== Iceland ===
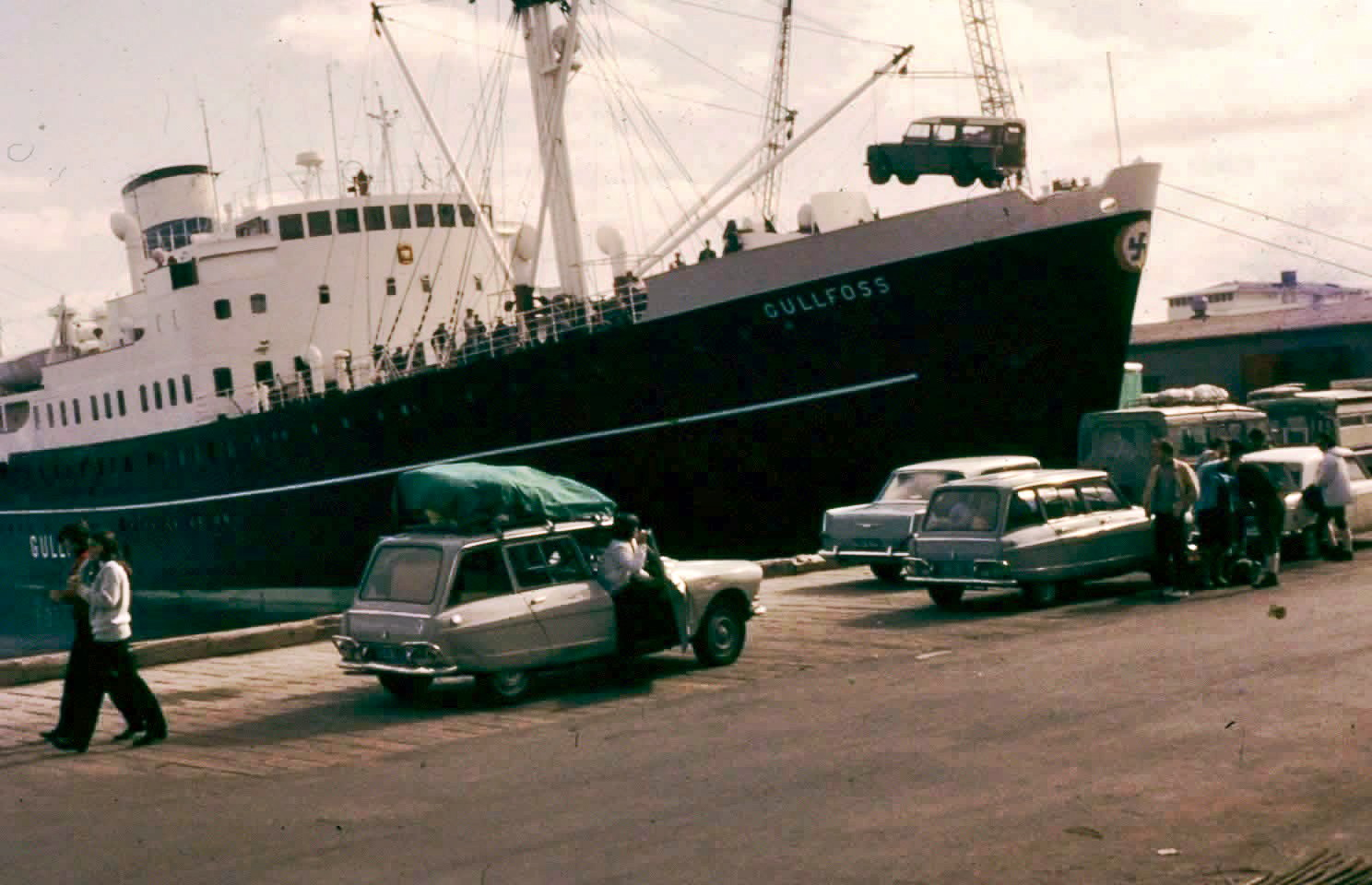
Swastika painted on the prow of MV Gullfoss in 1968

Eimskipafélag Íslands (founded in 1914), a major shipping company in Iceland, once used a variation on the swastika as their company logo. The appearance was similar to a blue fylfot on a white circle. Usage continued after World War II – MV Gullfoss in service from 1950 to 1972 had the symbol in a roundel on the ship's prow. Although they have since replaced their logo, the swastika remained on their old headquarters, located in downtown Reykjavík. When the Radisson SAS hotel franchise bought the building, the company was banned from destroying the symbol since the building was on the list of historical sites in Iceland. A compromise was made when the company was allowed to cover the symbol with the numbers 1919 which was the year when the building was erected.

=== Ireland ===
Ancient swastikas are found sparingly throughout Ireland, starting in the 5th-7th centuries AD.

In Dublin, Ireland, a laundry company known as the Swastika Laundry existed for many years in Dartry and Ballsbridge (both on the river Dodder) on the south side of the city. It was founded in 1888 as the Dublin Laundry Company. Upon the outbreak of World War II in 1939, the company's customers were concerned about the company's name. Accordingly, it was changed to "Swastika Laundry (1912) Ltd". The company's fleet of electric delivery vans were red, and featured a black swastika on a white background.

The business started in 1912 and continued up until 1987. The Laundry's tall chimneystack was emblazoned with a large white swastika, a protected structure, which was clearly visible from the surrounding streets. The name and logo eventually disappeared when the laundry was absorbed into the Spring Grove company.

In his Irisches Tagebuch (Irish Journal), the future Nobel Laureate, Heinrich Böll writes about a year spent living in the west of Ireland in the 1950s. While in Dublin before heading to Co. Mayo, he:

... was almost run over by a bright-red panel truck whose sole decoration was a big swastika. Had someone sold Völkischer Beobachter delivery trucks here, or did the Völkischer Beobachter still have a branch office here? This one looked exactly like those I remembered; but the driver crossed himself as he smilingly signalled to me to proceed, and on closer inspection I saw what had happened. It was simply the "Swastika Laundry", which had painted the year of its founding, 1912, clearly beneath the swastika; but the mere possibility that it might have been one of those others was enough to take my breath away.

=== Latvia ===
Latvian Air Force roundel until 1940

Flag of Pērkonkrusts

In Latvia, the swastika (known as Fire Cross, Latvian: ugunskrusts, or Thunder Cross, Latvian: pērkonkrusts) was used as the marking of the Latvian Air Force between 1918 and 1934, as well as in insignias of some military units. It was also used as a symbol by the Latvian fascist movement Pērkonkrusts, as well as by other organisations.

The Latvian left-facing swastika or Thunder Cross dates back to Bronze Age. It is widely seen scratched on surfaces like rocks, and on weapons and pottery as a protector sign.

=== Norway ===
The iron balconies of the building facing Veiten in Bergen are also decorated with swastikas. While it may appear that they date back to World War II, as they face the old Gestapo headquarters, they are actually twenty years older.

The headquarters of the Oslo Municipal Power station was designed by architects Bjercke and Eliassen in 1928–1931. The architects knew the swastika as a symbol of electricity and were not yet aware that it had been usurped by the German Nazi party, having swastikas adorn its wrought iron gates. Notably, the gates survived the cleanup after the German occupation of Norway during World War II.

Mikal Sylten took up the swastika as a symbol in 1917 for his antisemitic periodical Nationalt Tidsskrift.

=== Poland ===
The "highlander cross", a fylfot, was the sign of Polish 21st and 22nd Mountain Infantry Divisions

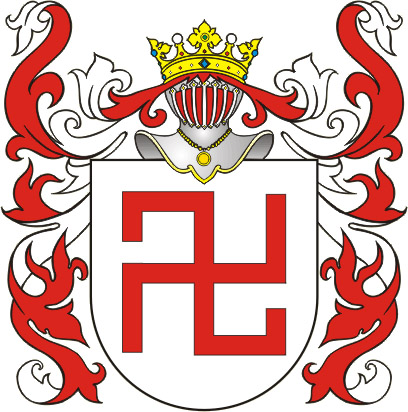
Boreyko Coat of Arms

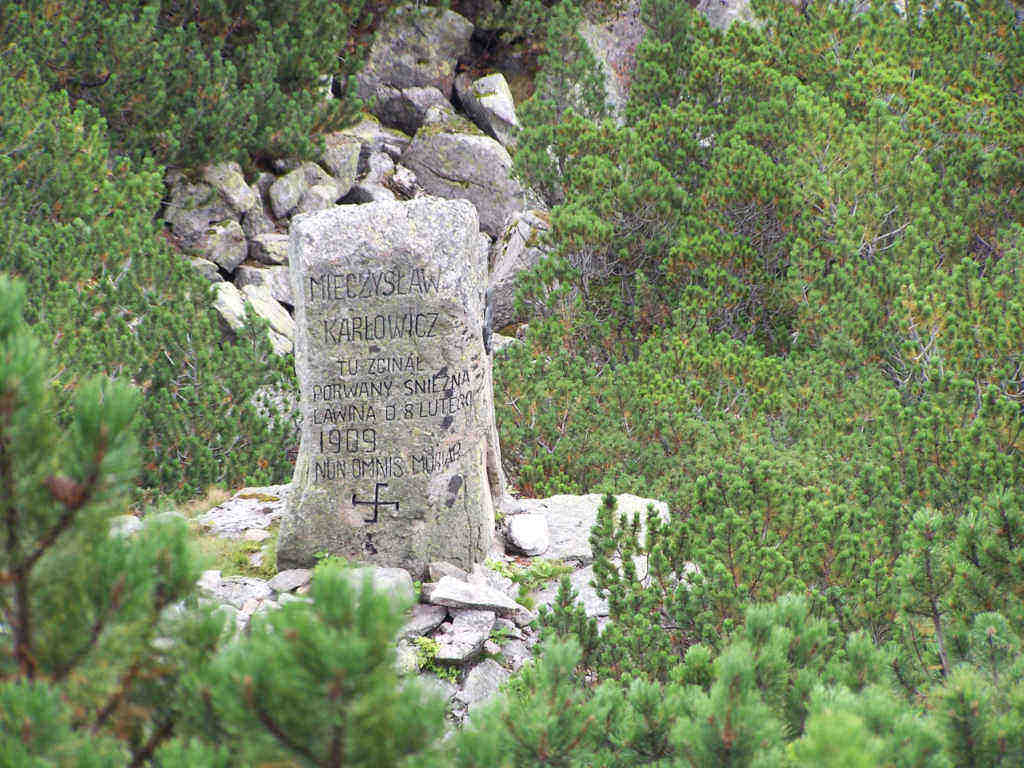
Karłowicz's Stone in the Tatra Mountains

Since the early Middle Ages the sign of the swastika was well established among all Slavic lands. Known as swarzyca, it was primarily associated with one of the Slavic gods named Svarog.

With time the association with Slavic gods faded, but the swastika was preserved both as a personal symbol of various personalities, such as the Boreyko Coat of Arms, and in folk culture, for example, in the region of Podhale, where the swastika was used as a talisman well into the 20th century. As a solar symbol, it was painted or carved on various parts of houses in the Tatra Mountains and was thought to save the household from evil.

The ancient symbol used by the Góral societies was adopted by the Polish mountain infantry units in the 1920s. It was adopted as a regimental insignia by the artillery units of the 21st and 22nd Infantry Divisions, as well as by the soldiers of the 4th Legions' Infantry, the 2nd and the 4th Podhale Rifles. A distinctive blue swastika was a background emblem of the Air defence and Anti-gas League (1928–1939, LOPP), which had circa 1.5 million members in 1937.

Outside of the military traditions, the mountaineer's insignia also influenced a number of other symbols and logos used on Polish soil. Among them were the logo of the IGNIS publishing company (est. 1822), and the personal symbol of Mieczysław Karłowicz, a notable composer and admirer of the Tatras. After his death in the mountains in 1909, the place of his death was marked by a memorial stone and a fylfot.

=== Russia ===
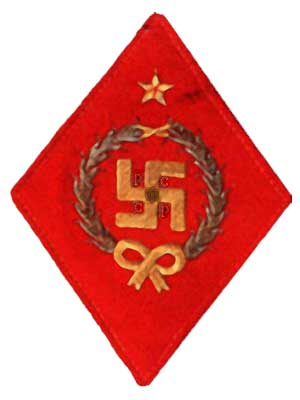
Russian Red Army South-East front: emblem of the Kalmyk units, founded in 3 Nov. 1919.

The left-facing swastika was a favorite sign of the last Russian Empress Alexandra Feodorovna. She placed it where she could for happiness, including drawing it in pencil on the walls and windows in the Ipatiev House – where the royal family was executed. There, she also drew a swastika on the wallpaper above the bed where the heir apparently slept.

The Russian Provisional Government of 1917 printed a number of new bank notes with right-facing, diagonally rotated swastikas in their centres The banknote design was initially intended for the Mongolian national bank but was re-purposed for Russian ruble after the February revolution. During the Russian Civil War, the Red Army's Kalmyk units wore distinct armbands featuring the swastika with "РСФСР" (Roman:"RSFSR") inscriptions on them.

In 1922, People's Commissar of Education Anatoly Lunacharsky issued a warning prohibiting further use of the swastika in the Soviet Union because of its association with fascism:

Due to a misunderstanding, an ornament called a swastika is constantly used on many decorations and posters. Since the swastika is a cockade of the deeply counter-revolutionary German organization Orgesch, and has recently acquired the character of a symbolic sign of the entire fascist reactionary movement, artists are warned in not to use this ornament under any circumstances as it induces a deeply negative impression, especially in foreigners.

=== Spain ===
In 1914, Euzkeltzale-Bazkuna, the group promoting the Basque language in the Bilbao branch of the Basque Nationalist Party proposed a swastika as a silver lapel pin to mark Basque speakers. They considered the curvilinear lauburu and the rectilinear swastika as primitive Basque symbols. Later Euzkadi advertised the sale of this badge, the euskalorratza, "Basque needle". As time passed, it became associated to Basque nationalism. Its use became more common from 1931 and the Second Spanish Republic. Giant swastikas were painted in the campaign for the Basque Autonomy Act of 1933.

In 1932, the leftist Basque Nationalist Action (EAE-ANV) chose for its flag a white swastika in a green six-pointed star. The swastika was variously said to represent the Basque language and race or happiness, living together.

By the end of the Republic, the confusion of the Basque nationalist swastika (horizontal and vertical) with the Nazi version (tilted 45 degrees) led to substitution of the "Basque swastika" with the lauburu. However, during the Spanish Civil War, some mendigoxale ("mountaineer") corps still used swastikas in their flags. The bombing of Gernika by the swastika-bearing German Legion Condor would make clear the incompatibility of both swastika uses. The flag used by EAE-ANV during the war already used a lauburu instead of a swastika.

In 1962, it was possible to find typed swastikas in ETA's clandestine organ Zutik due to the technical difficulty of drawing a lauburu. In 1981, the old nationalist Zurizpi tried to claim the swastika for the Basques but had no success.

=== Sweden ===
ASEA logo used from the late nineteenth century until 1933

The 1872 painting Thor's Fight with the Giants by the Swedish artist Mårten Eskil Winge features a swastika clearly visible in Thor's belt.

The Swedish company ASEA, now a part of ABB, in the late 1800s introduced a company logo featuring a swastika. The logo was replaced in 1933, when Adolf Hitler came to power in Germany. During the early 1900s, the swastika was used as a symbol of electric power, perhaps because it resembled a waterwheel or turbine. On maps of the period, the sites of hydroelectric power stations were marked with swastikas.

=== United Kingdom ===
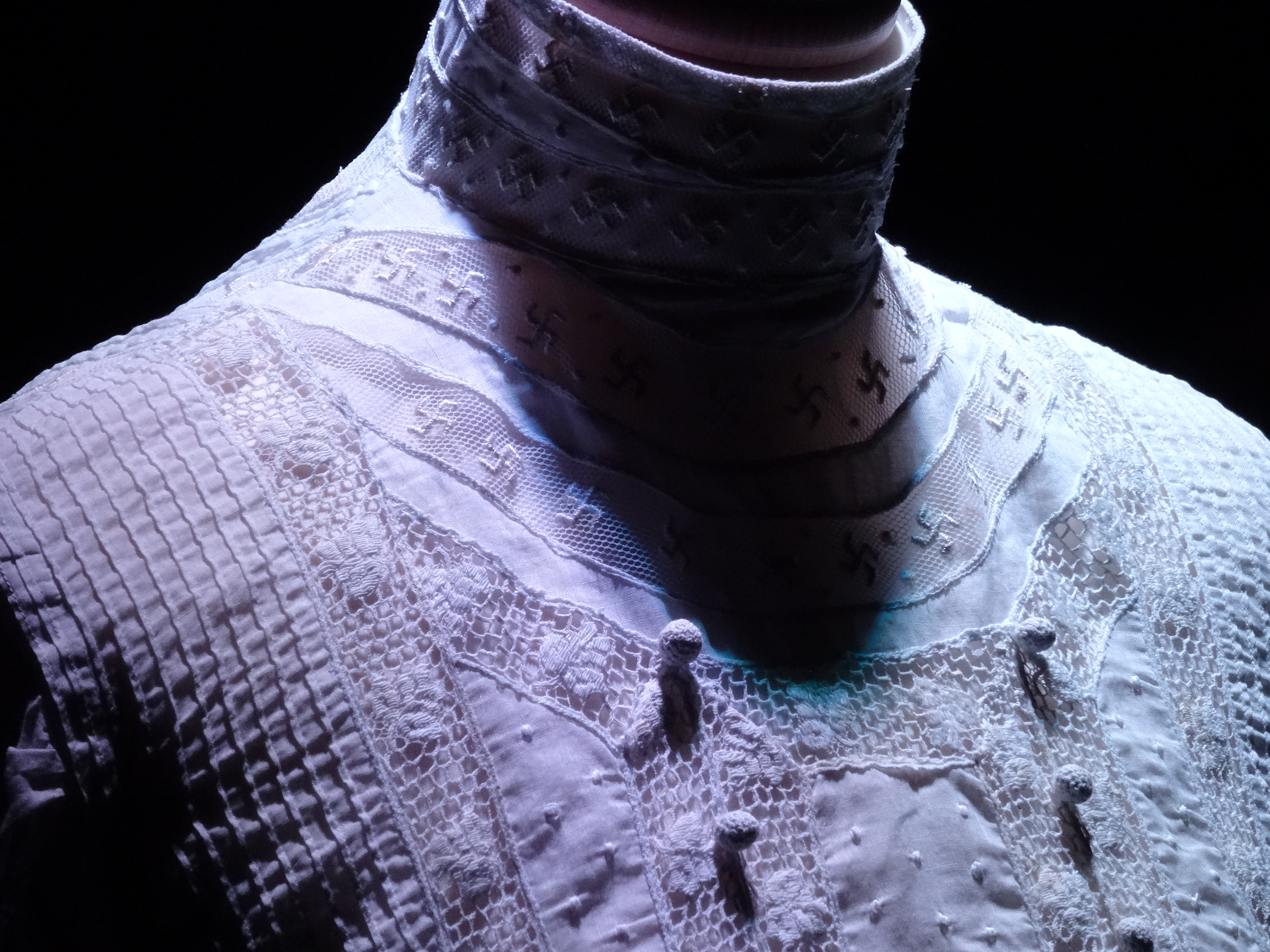
Swastikas on the wedding dress as symbols of luck, British colony, 1910

The Anglo-Indian author Rudyard Kipling (1865–1936), who was strongly influenced by Indian culture, used a swastika as his personal emblem on the covers and flyleaves of many editions of his books, along with the elephant, signifying his affinity with India. With the rise of Nazism, Kipling ceased to use the swastika. One of his Just So Stories, "The Crab That Played with the Sea", included an elaborate full-page illustration by Kipling including a stone bearing what was called "a magic mark" (a swastika); some later editions of the stories blotted out the mark on the stone, but left the caption unaltered, leaving readers puzzled.

Logo from a 1911 edition of Rudyard Kipling

During the First World War, the swastika was used as the emblem of the British National War Savings Committee.

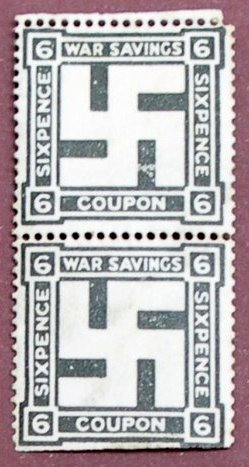
British national savings stamp, 1916

The swastika was also used as a symbol by the Boy Scouts in Britain, and worldwide. According to "Johnny" Walker, the earliest Scouting use was on the first Thanks Badge introduced in 1911. Robert Baden-Powell's 1922 Medal of Merit design added a swastika to the Scouting fleur-de-lis as a token of good luck for the person receiving the medal. Like Kipling, Baden-Powell would have come across this symbol in India. During 1934, many Scouters requested a change of design because of the use of the swastika by the Nazis. A new British Medal of Merit was issued in 1935.

A bank in Bolton has refused to remove swastika mosaic tiles from the entry of a branch office constructed in 1927. A bank spokesperson replied to critics noting that "At that time, these symbols were commonly used as architectural decoration."

Located on the Woodhouse Crag, on the northern edge of Ilkley Moor in West Yorkshire there is a swastika-shaped pattern engraved in a stone, known as the Swastika Stone. The figure in the foreground of the picture is a 20th-century replica; the original carving can be seen a little further away, at the centre-left of the picture.

There are both left- and right-facing swastikas on the war memorial at the entrance to Balmoral Castle in Scotland.

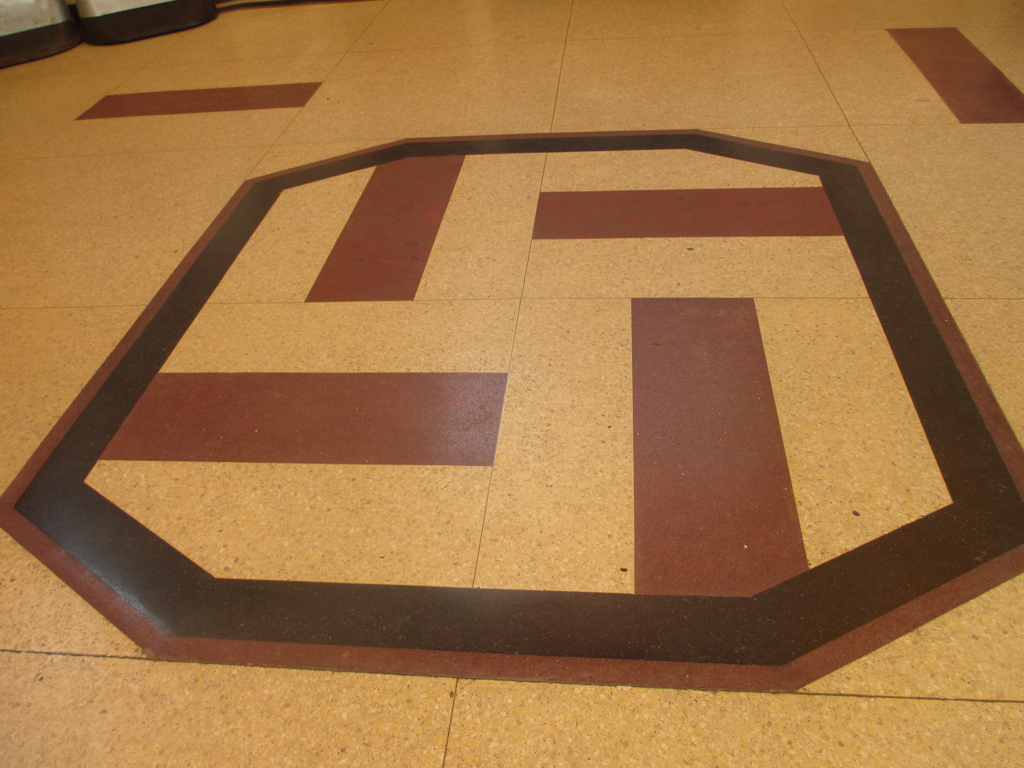
Upminster Bridge tube's swastika

There is a swastika-like tile pattern on the floor of the entrance hall of Upminster Bridge tube station in London, opened in 1934.

The druids in the mid-1920s adorned their dress with swastikas.

Thanks Badge used in Scouting

There is a fylfot made into the brickwork on a building inside the British Aerospace factory in Broughton in Wales. It is unknown why the fylfot was put on a brick, but it has been suggested it was done so because it was an ancient Asian peace symbol. The current Broughton site which makes wings for the Airbus has a history of fighter plane construction going back to WWI.

The Royal Air Force's 273 Squadron adopted a cruciform fylfot as opposed to the Nazi Swastika which was a reversed fylfot, which it used as a squadron badge. It was around since the earliest RAF in 1918 and was an emblem for the Ceylon Fighter Defence in 1939.

The Essex County Council headquarters in Chelmsford features engraved swastika facing both left and right. Construction began in 1928; the building was finished in 1939, the same year Britain declared war on Nazi Germany. The architectural design had been finalized years before.

Many churches and cathedrals in the UK feature swastika motifs.

== North America ==
=== Canada ===
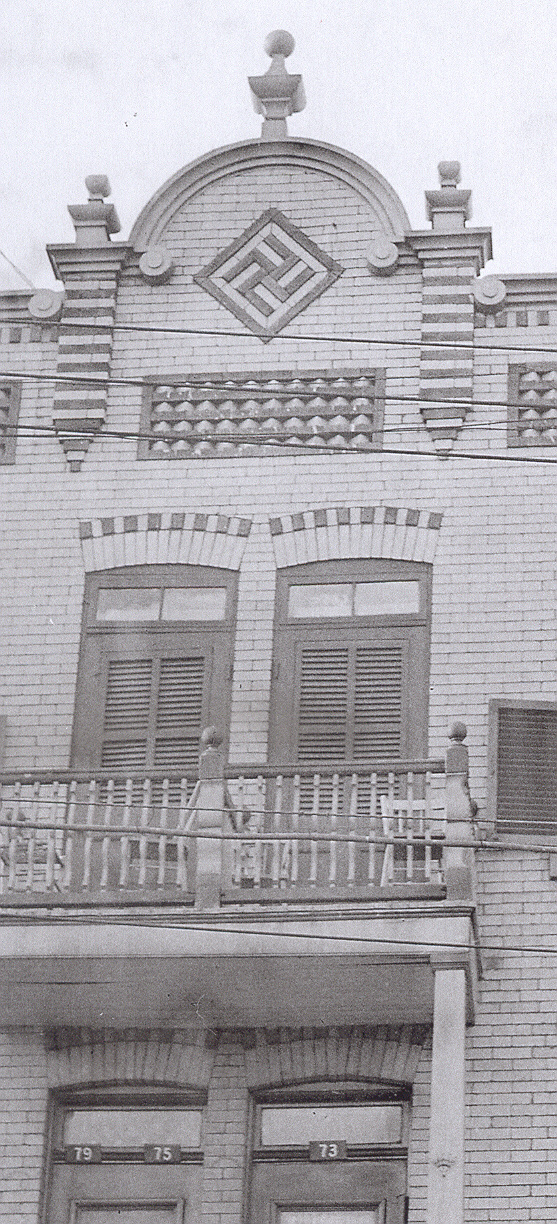
73 Troy Street in Verdun, Montreal, Canada

Swastika is the name of a small residential community in northern Ontario, Canada, approximately 580 kilometres (360 miles) north of Toronto, and 5 kilometres (3 miles) west of Kirkland Lake, the town of which it is now part. The town of Swastika was founded in 1906. Gold was discovered nearby and the Swastika Mining Company was formed in 1908. The government of Ontario attempted to change the town's name during World War II, but the town resisted and many posted signs "To hell with Hitler. We came up with our name first!". The Swastika United Church is located in Swastika, Ontario, as is the Swastika Public School, Swastika Fire Hall and Swastika Laboratories, which provides assaying services for the mining industry.

In Puslinch, Ontario, a private road called Swastika Trail has been the subject of debate for years. In 2020, Divisional Court declined to overturn the township's decision to keep the name despite the objection of some residents.

In Windsor, Nova Scotia, there was the Windsor Swastikas ice hockey team from 1905 to 1916, and their uniforms featured swastika symbols. There were also hockey teams named the Swastikas in Edmonton, Alberta (circa 1916), and the Fernie Swastikas in Fernie, British Columbia (circa 1922).

The Traveller's Hotel in downtown Ladysmith, British Columbia, has a façade decorated with brickwork swastikas. Further north on Vancouver Island, the Japanese cemetery in Cumberland has several grave markers decorated with swastikas.

A repeating pattern of swastikas appeared on a few Canadian postage stamps that were produced by commercial airlines from 1924 to 1932.

There used to be a swastika brick pattern located outside at the top of a house located at 75–81 Troy Street, in Verdun, a borough of Montreal, Quebec.

The swastika was also used as border art for the weekly pet health column in the Calgary Herald newspaper in the early years of the 20th century.

The community of Pointe-des-Cascades, Quebec was inundated with hate mail and phone calls after local officials stopped an attempt to paint over a swastika embossed on a heavy anchor on display at the local maritime museum's open air anchor display. The 2017 incident in the historic community on the Saint Lawrence River generated news coverage across Canada. The embossed swastika had been painted black with a white background, consistent with the Nazi symbol color scheme. A museum plaque inaccurately suggested the anchor was Nazi, but it was British, predated the Nazi era and similar anchors are on display at other museums including two in Ontario and one in the United States. British commercial and military ships used similar anchors. Plans were made to replace the plaque with one that provides accurate context. The local activist who attempted to paint over the embossed symbol told a reporter that the fact that the swastika and anchor are not German and not Nazi, is irrelevant.

IN 2019 the Manitoba Hydro company indicated that swastika logos would be removed from electrical generators. Swedish electrical engineering firm Allmanna Svenska Elektriska Aktiebolaget (ASEA) incorporated a swastika as their corporate emblem at the time the equipment was manufactured. The generators were installed in 1911 at Pointe du Bois, Manitoba and Slave Falls in 1930.

=== Central America ===
The flag of the Guna Yala community

Alternate version adopted in 1942

A swastika shape is a symbol in the culture of the Guna people of Guna Yala, Panama. In Guna tradition it symbolises the octopus that created the world, its tentacles pointing to the four cardinal points. In February 1925, the Guna revolted vigorously against Panamanian suppression of their culture, and in 1930 they assumed autonomy. The flag they adopted at that time is based on the swastika shape, and remains the official flag of Guna Yala. A number of variations on the flag have been used over the years: red top and bottom bands instead of orange were previously used, and in 1942 a ring (representing the traditional Guna nose-ring) was added to the center of the flag to distance it from the symbol of the Nazi party.

=== United States ===
==== As a Native American symbol ====
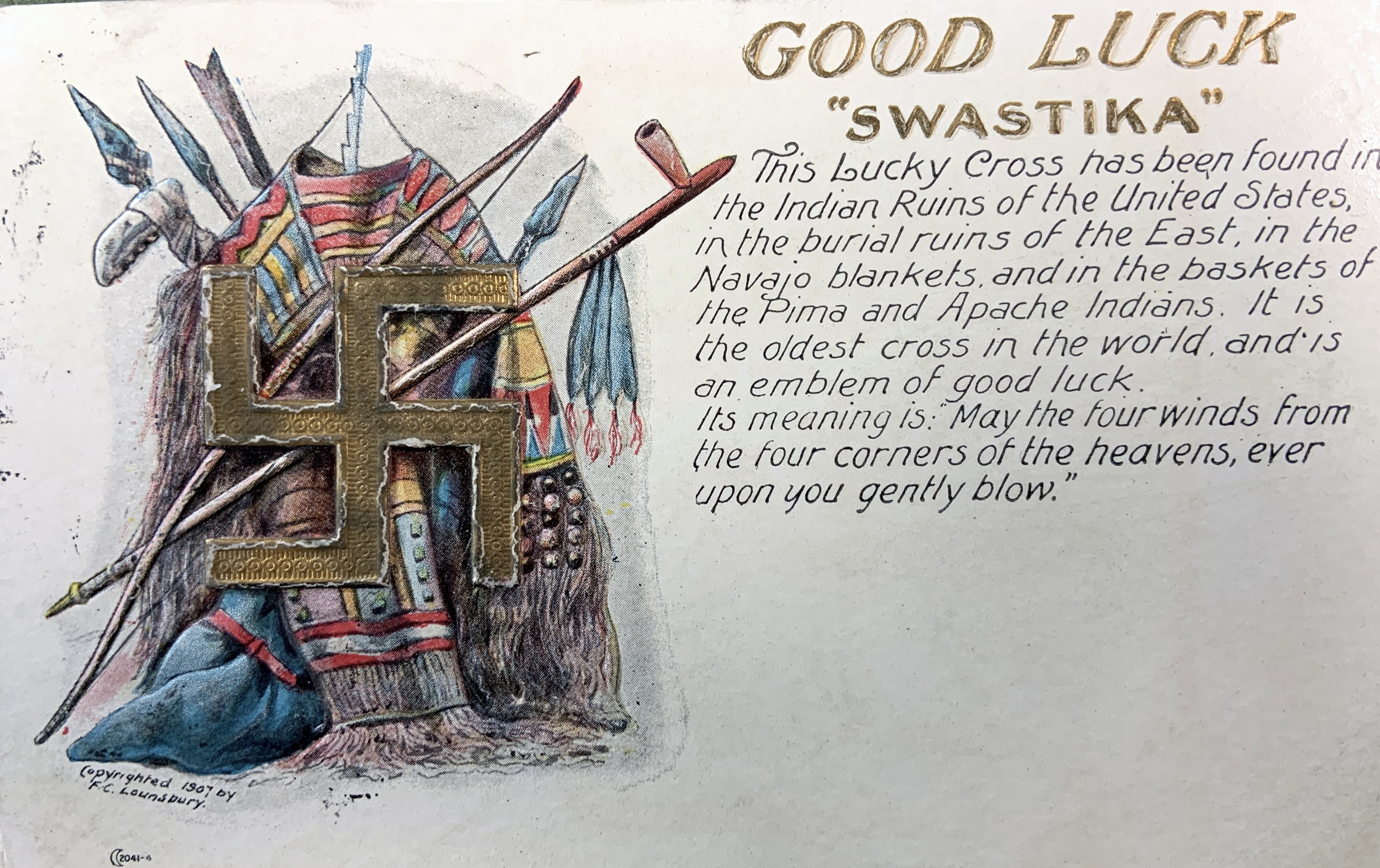
A postcard from 1907 showing the Navajo Good Luck symbol

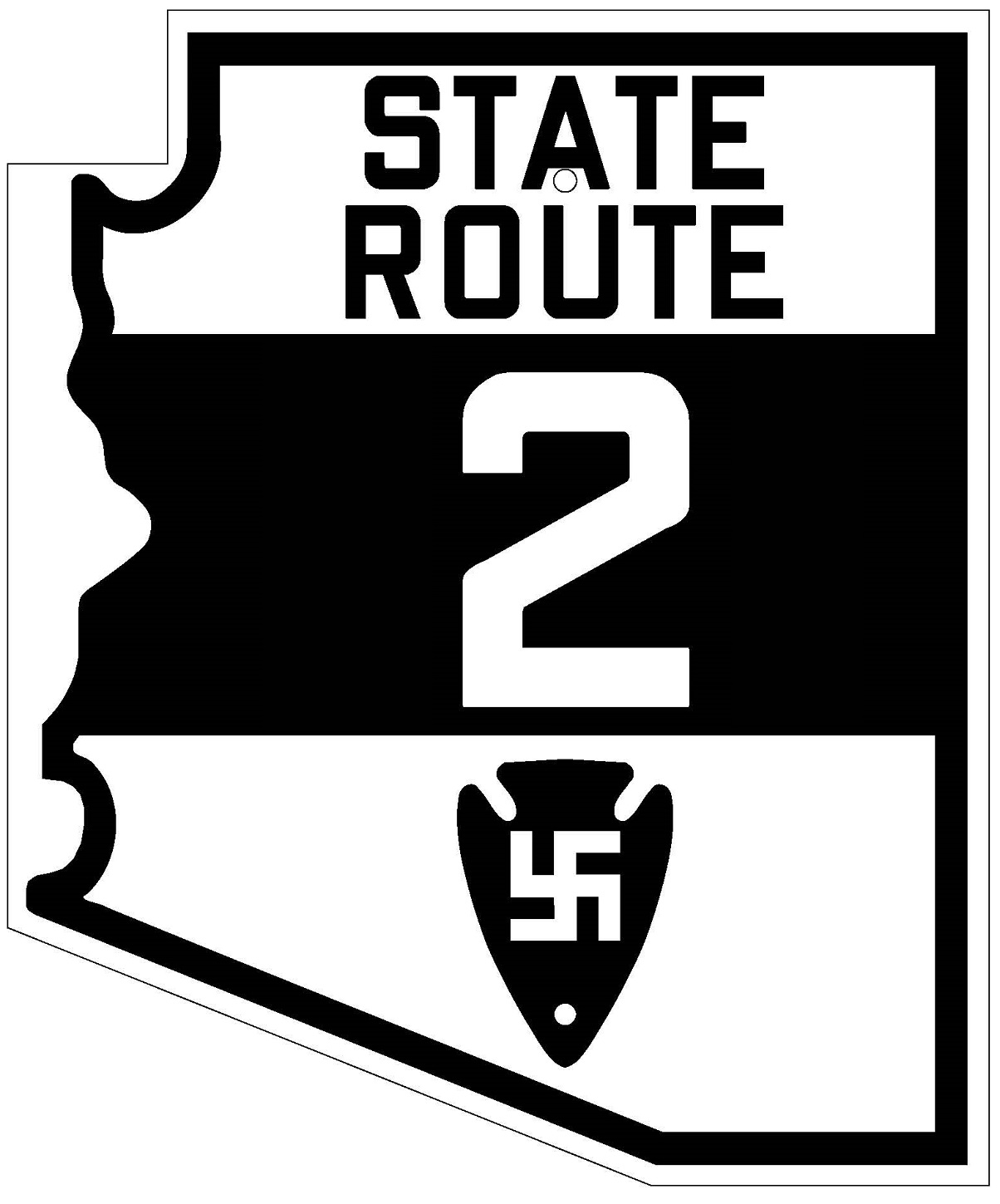
Arizona state highway marker from the late 1920s

Because this was a popular symbol with the Navajo people, the Arizona State Highway Department marked its state highways with signs featuring a right-facing swastika superimposed on an arrowhead. In 1942, after the United States entered World War Two, the department replaced the signs.

The original Penobscot Building in Detroit, Michigan, completed about 1906, "was named after the Penobscot Indian tribe and region of Maine, the boyhood home of one of the investors. An interesting feature in the Indian-themed detail of the building is the occasional appearance of a swastika, a symbol important to the Penobscots long before it was adopted by the Nazi party." The decorative symbols feature right-facing arms and are tilted in the same manner as the Nazi flag, leading to confusion over their origin.

The Passamaquoddy Nation, whose homeland within Dawnland extends across the Canada–United States border between Maine and New Brunswick, used an elongated swastika on their war canoes in the American colonial period as well as later. A carving of a canoe with a Passamaquody swastika was found in a ruin in the Argonne Forest in France, having been carved there by Moses Neptune, an American soldier of Passamaquody heritage, who was one of the last American soldiers to die in battle in World War I.

Shortly after the beginning of World War II, several Native American tribes (the Navajo, Apache, Tohono O'odham, and Hopi) published a decree stating that they would no longer use the swastika in their artwork:

Because the above ornament which has been a symbol of friendship among our forefathers for many centuries has been desecrated recently by another nation of peoples. Therefore it is resolved that henceforth from this date on and forever more our tribes renounce the use of the emblem commonly known today as the swastika or fylfot on our blankets, baskets, art objects, sandpainting, and clothing.

==== Use by the military ====
Original insignia of the 45th Infantry Division (from the American Indian symbol)

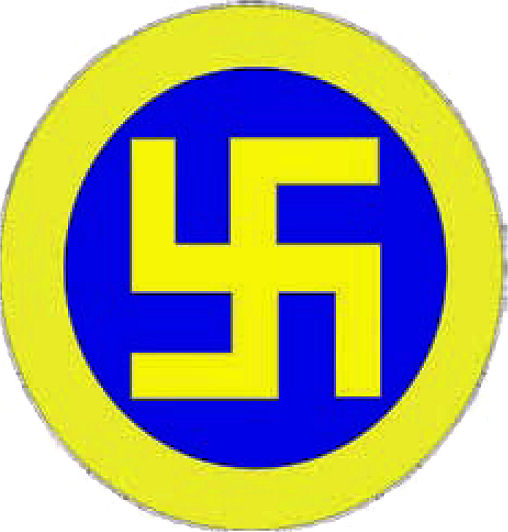
Former insignia of the 55th Pursuit Squadron

The 45th Infantry Division of the United States Army used a yellow swastika on a red background as a unit symbol until the 1930s, when it was switched to a thunderbird. The American Division wore the swastika patch while fighting against Germany in World War I.

The Lafayette Escadrille squadron flew World War I fighters against Germany from 1916 to 1918, first as volunteers under French command and later as a United States unit. The official squadron insignia was a Native American with a swastika adorned headdress. Some of the squadron planes also bore a large swastika in addition to the squadron insignia.

Among the Lafayette Escadrille members who were killed in action was Arthur Bluethenthal of Wilmington, North Carolina, who is buried in a Jewish cemetery with a grave marker that includes the squadron insignia, complete with swastika.

The U.S. Army 12th Infantry Regiment coat of arms includes a number of historic symbols. A tepee with small, left facing swastikas represents the unit's campaigns in the Indian Wars of the late 19th century. The Regiment fought German forces during World War II, landing on D-Day at Utah Beach, through five European campaigns and received a Presidential Unit Citation for action during the Battle of the Bulge.

==== Government usage ====
Swastikas surround the exterior window iconography at the Marriner S. Eccles Federal Reserve Board Building in Washington D.C. on Constitution Avenue between 20th and 21st Streets. The building was designed by Paul Philippe Cret and completed in 1937. Cret fought against Germany during World War I while serving in the French army.

The Reno, Nevada Post Office features both left and right facing swastikas, along with other designs typical of "Zig Zag Moderne" style, later known as a variation of "Art Deco". It was designed in 1932 by Frederic Joseph DeLongchamps, who had previously served as the Nevada State Architect. The building was financed in part by the federal Civil Works Administration and was listed on the National Register of Historic Places in 1990.

The Allentown, Pennsylvania Post Office, built in 1934, included inlaid swastika floor tiles. In 1965 The General Services Administration removed tiles with arms facing to the right, but retained some with arms facing to the left.

Grill at the U.S. Courthouse, Albuquerque

The six-story Federal Building in downtown Albuquerque, New Mexico features a Mediterranean style and decorative Native American design motifs. Built in 1930, its decorative features include "Radiators set in each wall of the foyer [that] are hidden by brass grilles in a swastika design". It has been listed on the National Register of Historic Places since 1980.

The third La Crosse County, Wisconsin courthouse was built in 1903 and razed in 1965. Numerous swastika patterns are visible in photographs of a mosaic tile floor. The symbols have shortened arms pointing to the left.

The DeKalb County Courthouse in Sycamore, Illinois, built in 1905, includes swastika decorated railings. The Classical Revival style courthouse was added to the National Register of Historic Places in 1978.

Swastikas are a minor feature in painted murals in the Allen County Courthouse in Fort Wayne, Indiana, completed in 1902. They are described as "a Native American symbol for joy". The murals were restored beginning in 1994 as part of an eight-year, $8.6 million project. The courthouse was listed on the National Register of Historic Places in 1976, and as a National Historic Landmark in 2003.

Mosaic swastika tile patterns decorate the floor of the Washington County Courthouse in Marietta, Ohio, designed by Cincinnati architect Samuel Hannaford and built in 1901. The tiles are described as "an adopted Indian symbol for 'good luck and prosperity.'"

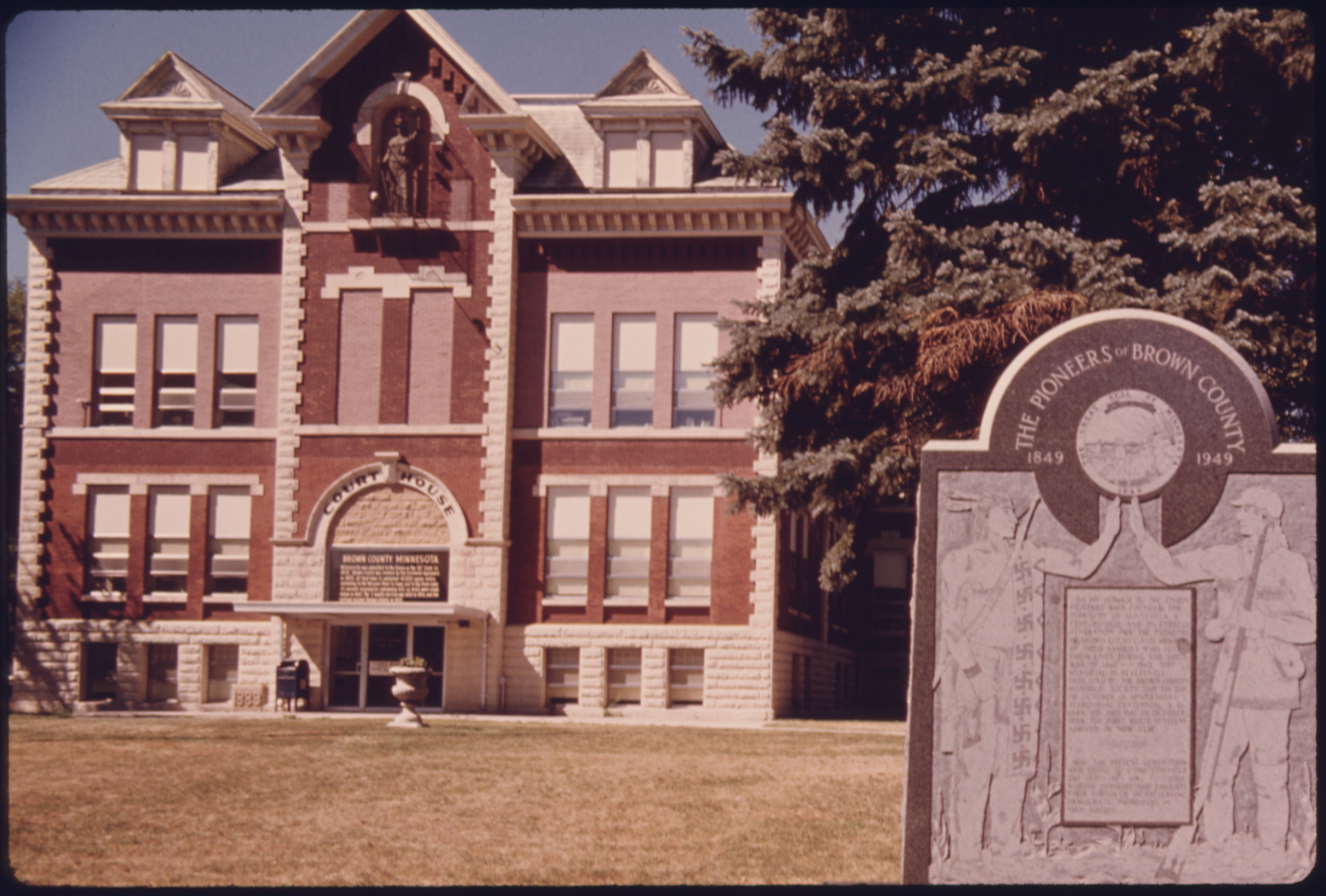
A plaque featuring the symbol on a Native American figure outside the Brown County courthouse

Swastikas are featured on a Native American figure on a plaque outside the Brown County courthouse in New Ulm Minnesota.

In 2017, a candidate for the Cedar Rapids, Iowa city council called for removal or alteration of a Native American scene in a restored 200-foot long City Hall mural because it contains a swastika symbol. The mural was created in 1936, part of the federal Treasury Relief Art Project when the building served as a federal courthouse. Several images in the mural had generated complaints for decades, resulting in it being painted over and then restored, twice.

The Laguna Bridge in Yuma, Arizona was built in 1905 by the U.S. Reclamation Department and is decorated with a row of swastikas with right-facing arms. "These symbols, the Yuma Sun writes, stem from a trip the project engineers took to India, where they “came across a symbol that represented a Hindu goddess with power over water." The bridge is part of the Laguna Diversion Dam project, based on examples in India of a weir design that fit local conditions.

==== Displayed with Christian and Jewish symbols ====
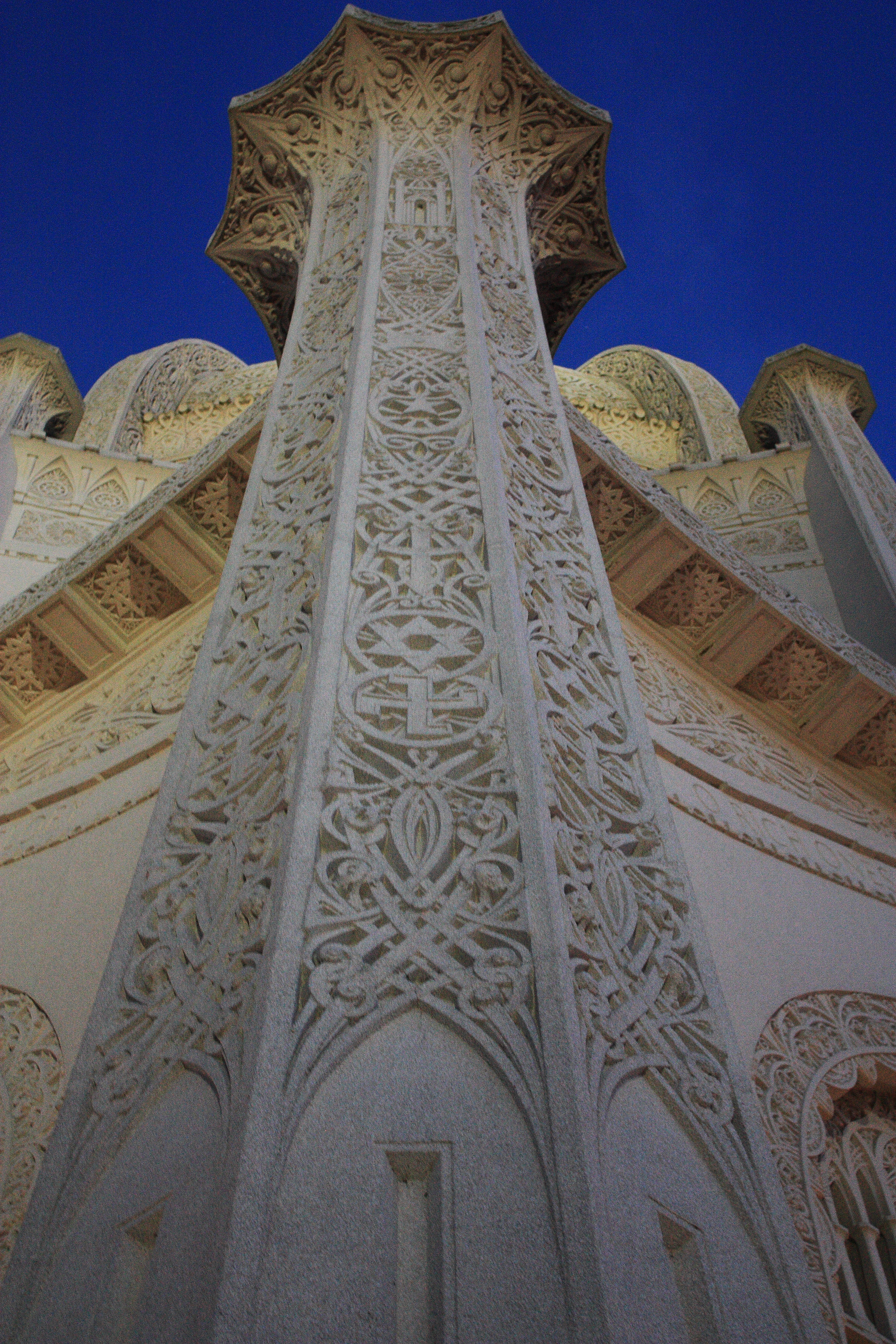
A pillar from the Baháʼí House of Worship

Several examples of U.S. architectural decoration feature swastikas displayed alongside other religious symbols.

The Baháʼí Faith's House of Worship for the North American continent, located in Wilmette, Illinois, depicts religious symbols on each of its 9 outer pillars. "The symbols are arranged in chronological order-from bottom to top-on the pillars. That's why the swastika is at the base, with the Star of David above it..." The design dates to 1920 but construction was not completed until 1953. The largest Baháʼí House of Worship in the world, the white domed building has been listed on the National Register of Historic Places since 1978.

The "Golden Rule Window" in the Transfiguration Episcopal Church in New York City features medallion symbols depicting world religions, with Buddhism represented by the "fylfot cross" near a Jewish menorah. Built in 1849 with several modifications through 1926, the church was listed on the National Register of Historic Places in 1973. During the Civil War the church worked for abolition of slavery and harboured runaway slaves.

A student union at the University of Michigan includes a 1929 chapel with stained glass windows that feature religious symbols. A swastika with right-facing arms is included, along with a Christian cross, Hebrew star and others.

The Yerkes Observatory in Lake Geneva, Wisconsin, established in 1897 by the University of Chicago, includes ornate decoration. The rotunda includes a swastika symbol adjacent to a Star of David.

==== Placenames ====
Swastika Park is the name of a housing subdivision in Miami, Florida, created in 1917.

A subdivision of Cherry Hills Village, Colorado was named "Swastika Acres" until April 16, 2019, when it was renamed to Old Cherry Hills. The name had been traced to the Denver Swastika Land Company, founded in 1908.

Swastika, New York, located near the Adirondack Park preserve in the northeast corner of the state, which is adjacent to "Swastika Road". In 2020 the town voted to keep the name despite its connotations.

The "Swastika Trail" is a historic auto trail in Iowa.

As early as 1914, "Swastika Beach" was recorded as the name of the unincorporated community at the southwest end of Fish Lake in Jackson County, Minnesota.

Swastika Lake is located in Albany County, Wyoming, in Medicine Bow – Routt National Forest.

==== Commercial usage ====
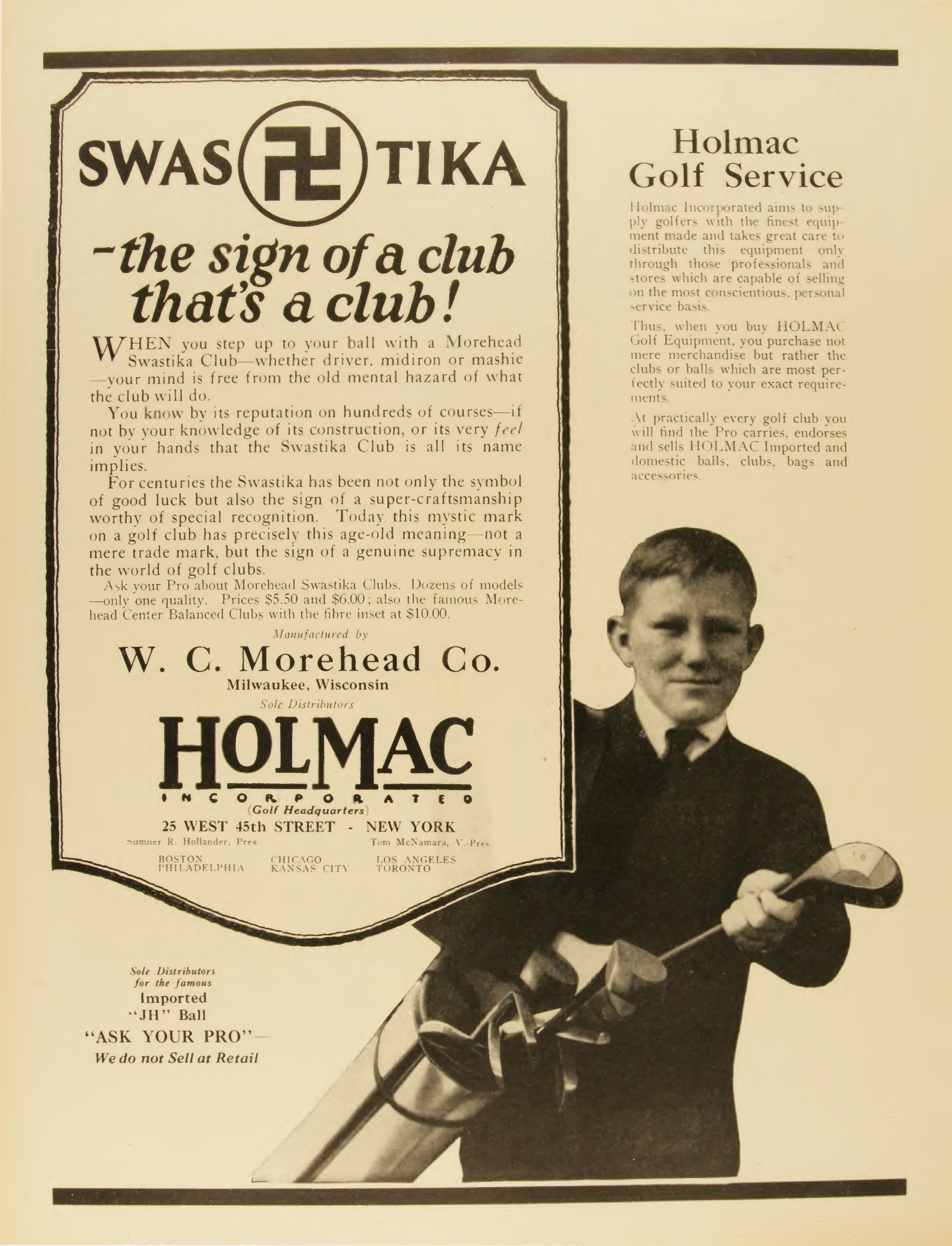
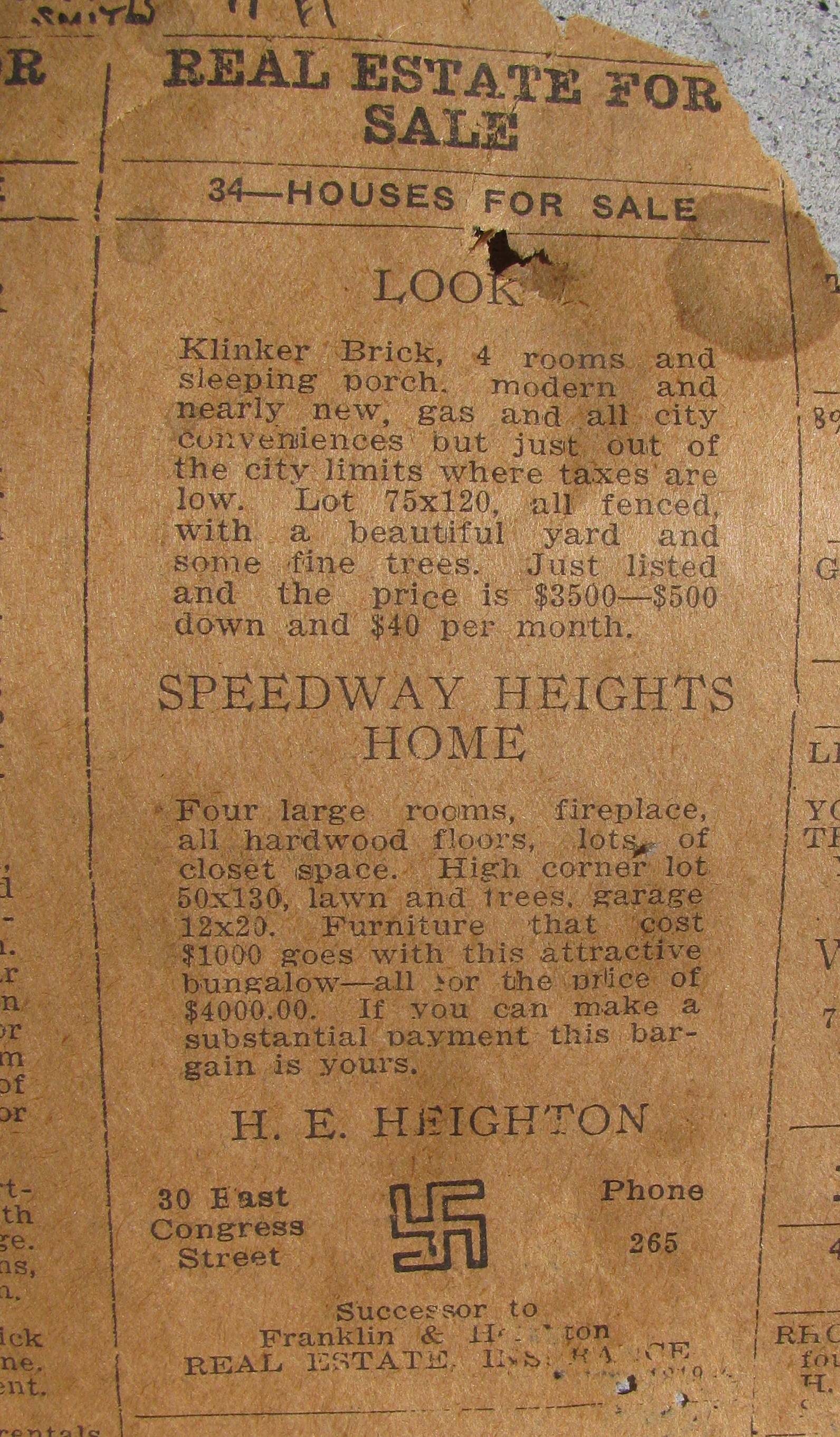
An ad for Morehead "Swastika" Golf Clubs, 1922 (top); an ad for a realtor using the swastika as a logo, 1926 in Tucson, Arizona (bottom)

In the early 1900s, swastikas were included on postcards wishing people good luck. By 29 December 1908, the Stanford Card Co. of Brooklyn New York was using swastikas. A red coloured swastika was also found on a 1910 postcard.

In the 1920s the Coca-Cola made 'lucky' brass watch fobs in the form of a swastika to advertise their product.

The K-R-I-T Motor Car Company, Detroit, Michigan built cars from 1909 to 1915 with a radiator badge that featured a right-facing white swastika on a blue background.

The Crane Valve Company manufactured steel valves in the 1920s and 30s in the U.S. with swastika markings, using a symbol with the arms pointed to the right.

The Buffum Tool Company of Louisiana, Missouri manufactured "High Grade Tools for High Grade Workmen" from about 1909 to 1922. The Buffum company's trademark was a swastika with right facing arms. During World War I it made bayonets and aeroplane parts. The company's logo was the "Good Luck/Blessing/Swastika Cross" and many of the products, sold nationwide, had "the good luck cross on them."

The Washington Charcrete Company manufactured "laundry trays" (concrete utility sinks) with an imprinted logo bearing a swastika. Some examples survive, but the date of their manufacture is unknown. The company did business in the states of Washington and Oregon and is mentioned in a 1914 ruling by the Supreme Court of Washington State.

The Duplex Adding Machine Company of St. Louis, Missouri issued stock certificates in 1910 that show the company's logo, a swastika with right-facing arms and math symbols.

Flour was sold under the brand name Swastika, The Lucky Flour by the Federal Milling Co., Lockport, N.Y. as advertised in 1909, and by the Monte Vista Milling and Elevator Company of Colorado, which registered the name in 1910.

The Downtown Historic District in Raton, New Mexico, listed on the National Register of Historic Places, includes the Swastika Coal office and Swastika Hotel buildings.

The mining town of Lakeview Idaho featured a "Swastika Hotel" in 1910, owned and operated by the Swastika Mining Company.

The St. Louis, Rocky Mountain and Pacific Railroad Company operated with cars and locomotives "emblazoned with the red swastika symbol adopted as the road's trademark." The symbol featured right facing arms and was tilted at an angle. The 105-mile "Swastika Line" operated from about 1902 to 1915, with major stops at Raton and Cimarron, New Mexico. The tracks were torn up for scrap during World War II when "Swastika Line iron was used to fight a different kind of swastika in Europe."

A "Swastika Theater" operated in Sausalito, California in the early 20th century. Another "Swastika Theater" operated in Akron, Indiana. The historic Strand Theatre, in Louisville, Mississippi, built in 1923 includes a facade with a left facing swastika.

The Swastika Novelty Company of Charleston, West Virginia, made a "talking board", similar to a Ouija board, in 1907.

"Swastika Boards" were built using laminated redwood and balsa wood by legendary surfer Lorrin "Whitey" Harrison in Los Angeles from 1931 until 1939 when they were renamed "Waikiki Surfboards" Swastikas became the most widely used production solid board of the period leading into World War II."

States Steamship Company painted a black swastika on the red funnels of their ships. This was changed in the 1940s to a white sun cross on a blue background and in the 1950s to a red seahorse.

In 2017 the Texas Maritime Museum in Rockport, Texas began displaying a stockless anchor manufactured by the British foundry W.L. Byers in Sunderland. The anchor was produced in 1931 with the company trademarks and an embossed square set swastika. The anchor had been found two years earlier 100 miles offshore of Louisiana by offshore oil workers and delivered to Texas A&M University's Conservation Research Laboratory. The Maritime Museum has placed signs explaining the history of the anchor and its symbol. A similar Byers anchor with swastika symbol generated controversy over its display at a museum in Pointe-des-Cascades, Quebec Canada.

==== In popular culture ====
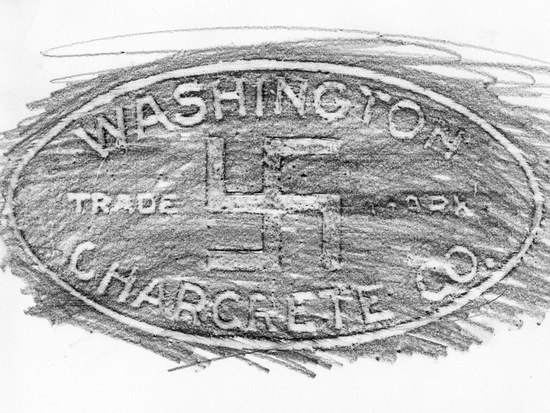
Logo of Washington Charcrete Co, early 20th century

The swastika is seen on binders of pre-Nazi era publications of works by Rudyard Kipling. Both left and right orientations were used.

Two white swastika symbols on an Indian blanket made an appearance in the 1922 Buster Keaton silent movie "The Paleface". A newspaper columnist noted Nazis had adopted the swastika in 1920, prior to the film's release, but that "Only a bonehead would read anything sinister into that coincidence."

Publisher Harold Hersey adopted a blue swastika as a symbol for his line of pulp magazines, Magazine Publishers. When the company was purchased by A. A. Wyn in 1929, the swastika was replaced with an Ace of Spades.

Swastika quilt patterns were popular in America prior to World War II. In 2010, the Greeley Museums in Greeley, Colorado, received a donated quilt covered in 27 swastikas, believed to date to around 1900. "The swastika quilt-block pattern is also known as the Battle X of Thor, Catch Me If You Can, Devil's Dark Horse, Whirligig and Zig Zag" according to the museum registrar. The quilt was not put on general display while museum officials considered how to provide context.

A quilt with swastika-like pattern dating to 1927 was removed from display from a Havre, Montana museum in December 2010 after complaints from the public. A group of residents of the Bear's Paw Mountains had embroidered their names in the historic quilt, a gift for an ill neighbour. "It was a very, very nice quilt and the story behind it was absolutely heartwarming" according to a member of the museum foundation.

Metal typeface Swastika borders were used by U.S. printers in the early 20th century. Controversy arose in 1937 when they appeared on Passaic, New Jersey sample election ballots. The printer responded, "I've used the swastika emblems for ballot borders long before the world ever knew Hitler."

In the 1925 novel The Great Gatsby, one of the characters runs a business called "The Swastika Holding Company".

One of the few examples of its decorative use in Post-war American popular culture can be found in the 1950 film Born Yesterday, directed by George Cukor, the son of Hungarian-Jewish immigrants. Wallpaper featuring prominent gold swastikas serve as the background to many scenes involving Broderick Crawford's character, Harry Brock.

==== Use by non-political clubs and organizations ====
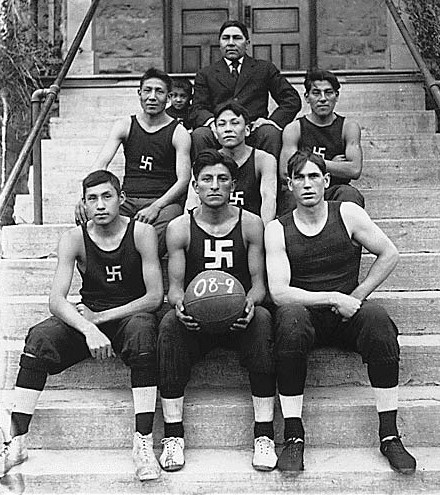
Chilocco Indian Agricultural School basketball team on Home 1 Steps, 1909

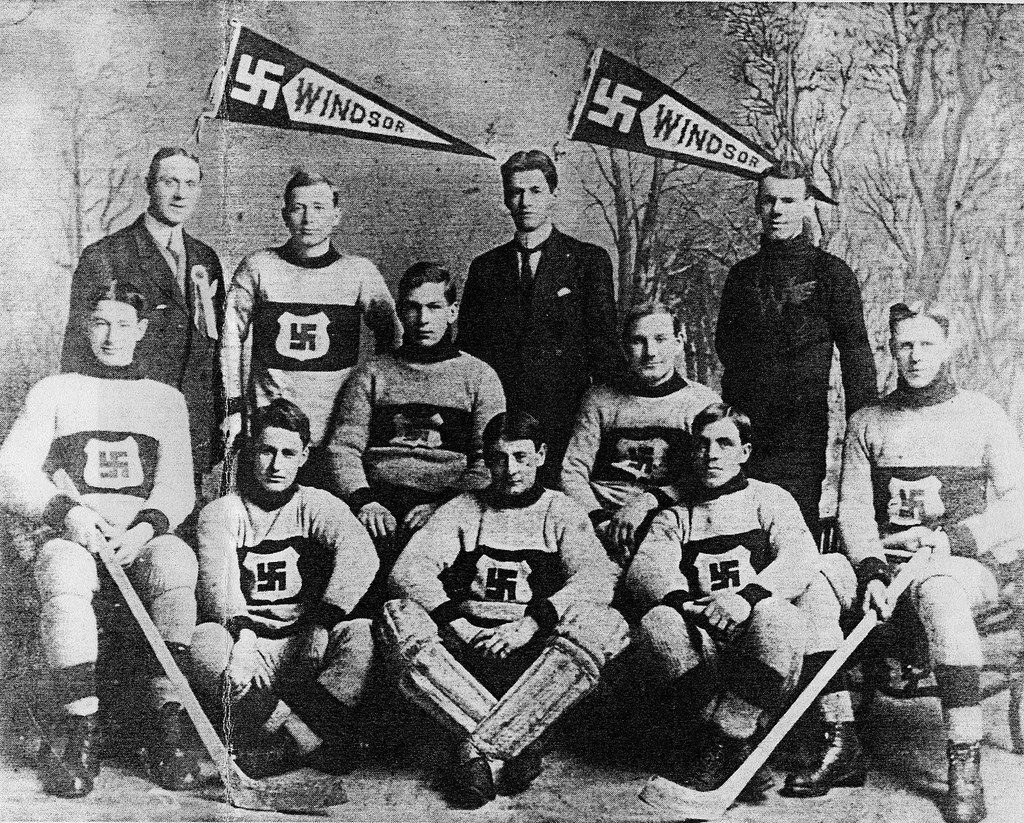
Windsor Swastikas hockey team, 1912

The Ladies' Home Journal sponsored a Girl's Club with swastika membership pins, swastika-decorated handkerchief and a magazine titled "The Swastika". Their version of the symbol was square with right facing arms. The club was formed at the beginning of the 20th century to encourage young women to sell magazine subscriptions.

The 1939 Tennessee State University yearbook lists a "Swastika Club" among women's student organisations. The group focused on literature, scholarship and "clear and straight thinking". Tennessee State is the only state-funded historically black university in Tennessee.

The yearbook for Catawba College in Salisbury, North Carolina, first published in 1927, was known as the "Swastika", after a Native American design pattern found in the original tile of a campus administration building. The name was changed in 1941. The liberal arts college was established by the United Church of Christ in 1851.

The Boston Braves professional baseball team wore a "luck inviting Swastika emblem" on the front of their caps on opening day in 1914.

At least one minor league baseball team used the name: the Cañon City Swastikas represented Cañon City, Colorado in the Class D Rocky Mountain League in 1912. The team moved to Raton, New Mexico mid-season, then disbanded along with the league.

The "Swastika Club of Freedom Township" was formed in 1923 in rural Iowa, a social club serving farm women. The group produced a "Swastika Club Cookbook" in 1934. Its name was changed to the "Freedom Township Women's Club" in 1942. Another "Swastika Club" for women met in Howell County Missouri in the 1920s.

The Swastika Canoe Club, of Pawtuxet Village competed with other canoe clubs in the eastern U.S.

==== Coins, tokens, and watch fobs ====
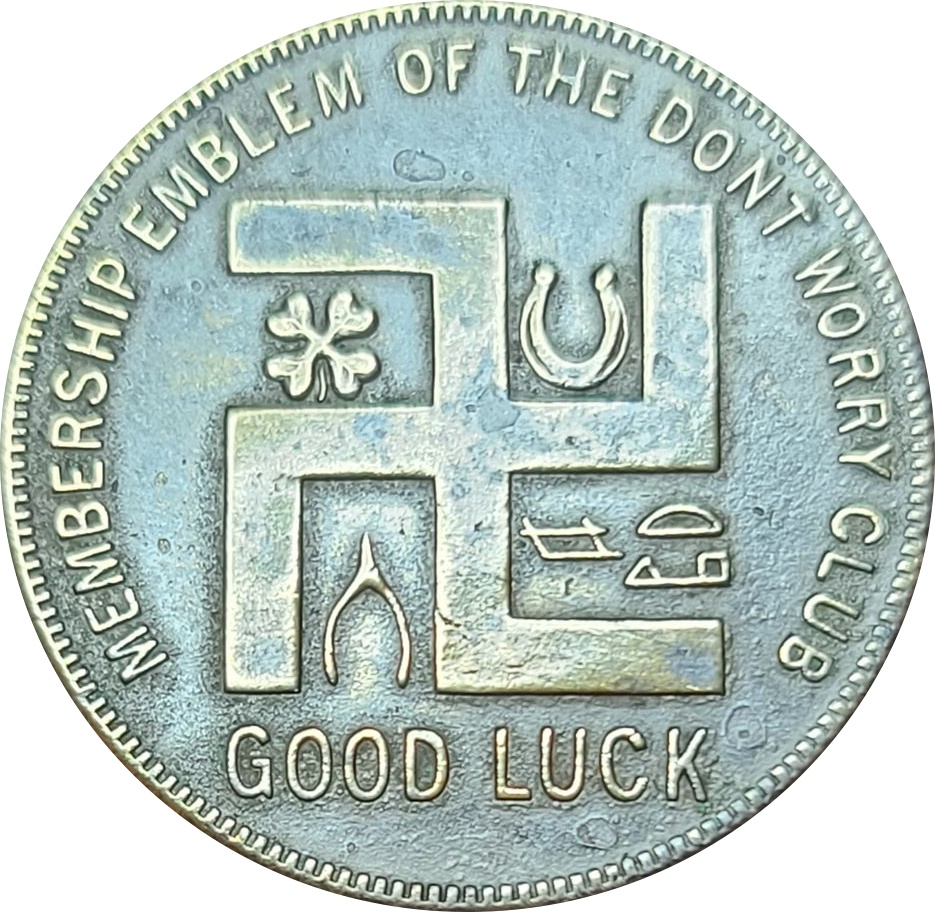
Reverse side of a Yungbluth & Kroeger clothing company token

Collectors have identified more than a thousand different swastika design coins, souvenir or merchant/trade tokens and watch fobs, distributed by mostly local retail and service businesses in the United States. The tokens that can be dated range from 1885 to 1939, with a few later exceptions. About 57 percent have the swastika symbol facing to the left, 43 percent to the right. Most promise good luck or feature other symbols such as a horseshoe, four leaf clover, rabbit's foot, wishbone or keys. Author Gary Patterson spent 35 years collecting over 1600 "Good Luck Swastika tokens" which were acquired and resold through online marketplaces.

In 1925, Coca-Cola made a lucky watch fob in the shape of a swastika with right-facing arms and the slogan, "Drink Coca-Cola in bottles five cents".

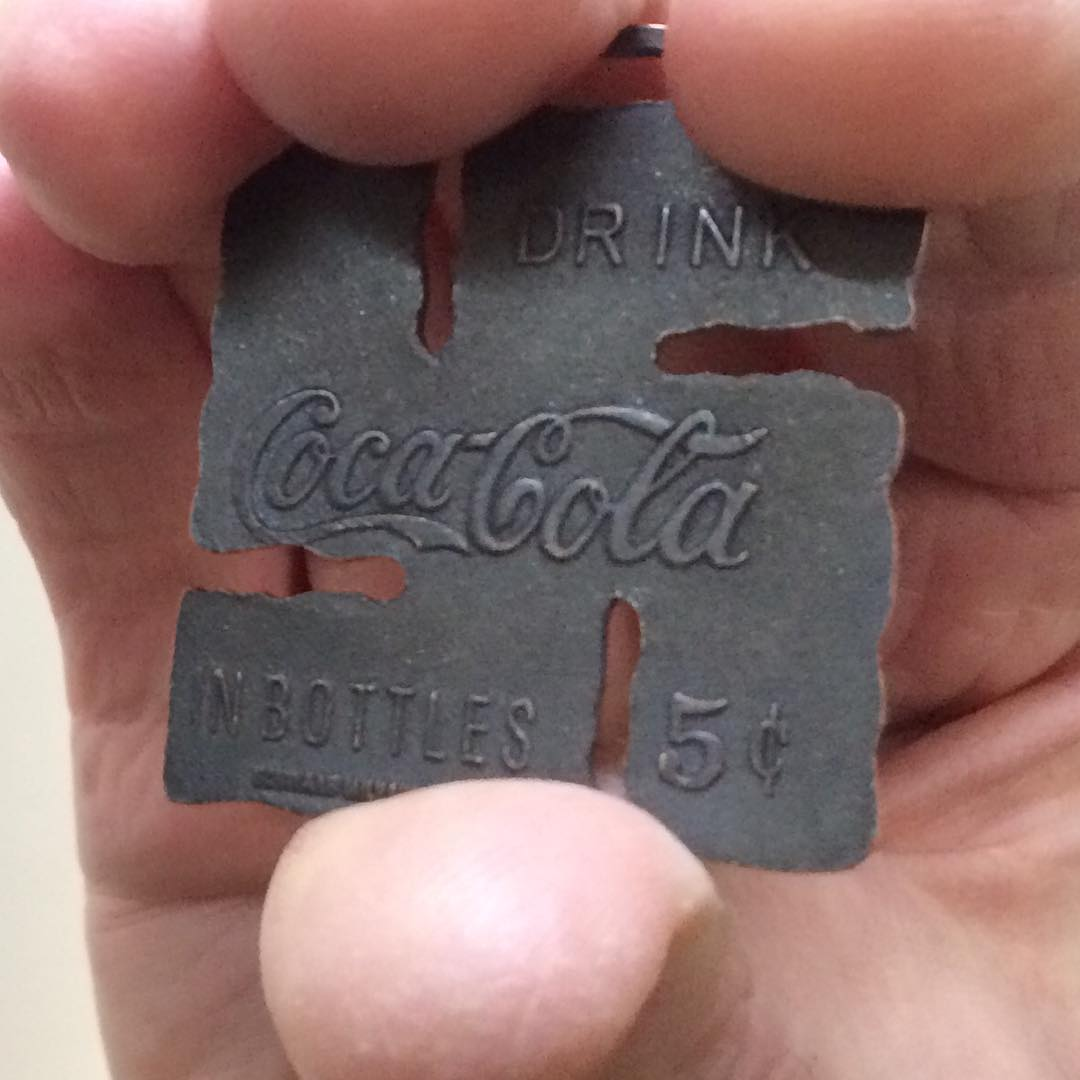
Coca-Cola swastika watch fob from 1927

The Waterloo Gasoline Engine Company of Waterloo, Iowa offered a "Good Luck" token featuring a left facing swastika in addition to a four-leaf clover, horseshoe, wishbone and Plains Indian emblem. The company was sold in 1918 and became known as the John Deere Tractor Company.

Harvard University Library has a 1908 leather watch fob with a brass swastika that was created for the presidential campaign of William Jennings Bryan.

The 1917 World War I good luck medal was produced in the United States with an American eagle superimposed by a four-leaf clover "and a swastika – an ancient symbol of good luck". The medal was designed by Adam Pietz, who served as Assistant Engraver at the United States Mint in Philadelphia for nearly 20 years.

Some Boy Scout good luck tokens issued by the Excelsior Shoe company feature the swastika on the reverse.

==== Architectural usage ====
The Cliff Dwellers Apartment building in New York City, completed in 1914, features two terracotta swastikas, tilted with arms pointing to the left. The building is well known for its western themed frieze, featuring buffalo skulls, mountain lions and rattlesnakes.

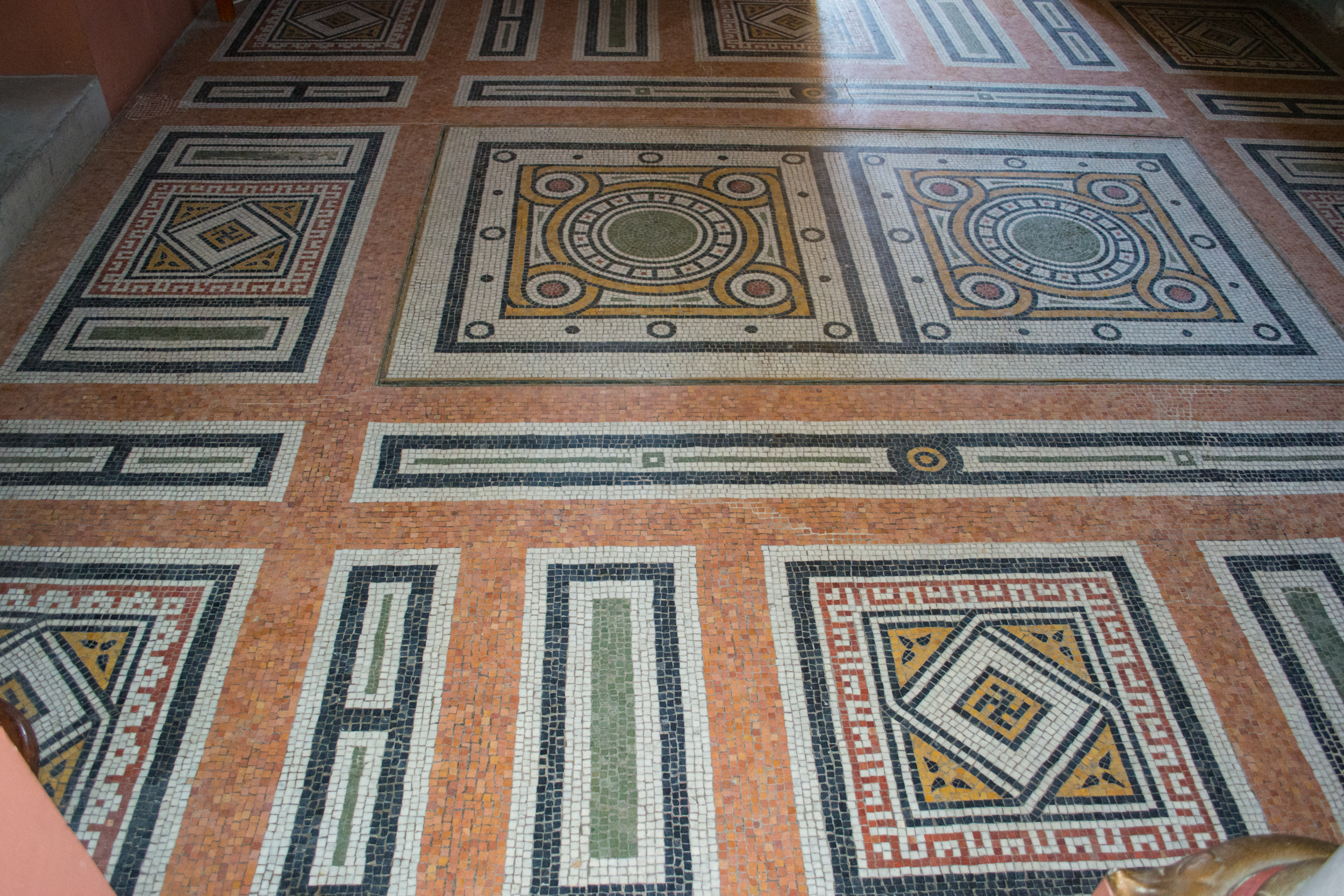
Tile floor on gallery - Garfield Monument

The Garfield Monument in Cleveland Ohio, dedicated in 1890 as a tomb and memorial for assassinated U.S. President James A. Garfield, contains swastika tile patterns throughout the floor. The 180-foot-tall (55 m) building was added to the National Register of Historic Places in 1973.

A small swastika is visible in the elaborate carvings representing several cultures above the main entrance to the Yale University Library.

A Chicago television investigative journalism report in July 2015 found numerous examples of swastikas in the city's architecture. "A swastika is on the front of Chicago's most popular tourist attraction, Navy Pier, and seen at the one of Columbia College's South Loop buildings. It is embedded in marble floors at University of Chicago on the Lower West Side and an embellishment on a city monument to Jacques Marquette. The design is on what is now the Bridgeview Bank, and the former Continental Illinois Bank, along with countless pre-WWII Chicago homes and apartment buildings."

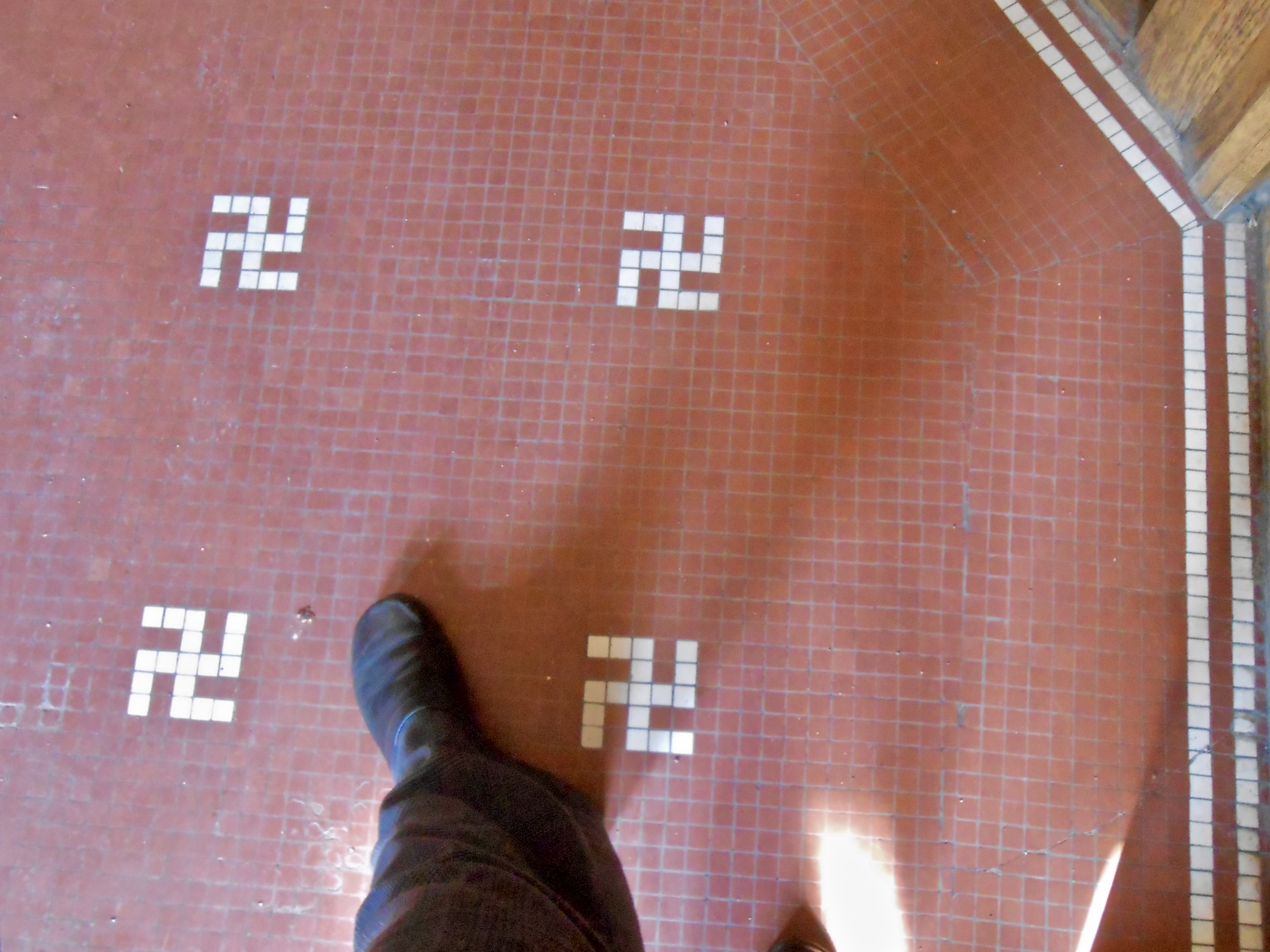
Montana Club foyer mosaic with swastika design, installed in 1893 and kept with 1905 restoration of the building following a fire

A swastika design, intended as a welcoming symbol of good fortune, inspired by Native American symbolism, was installed into the floor of the entryway of the Montana Club, at the time a private gentlemen's club in Helena, Montana, now a restaurant open to the public. Rebuilt in 1905 using a design by architect Cass Gilbert, the site is a conforming property in the Helena Historic District listed on the National Register of Historic Places.

The KiMo Theater in Albuquerque, New Mexico, built in 1927 in the Pueblo Deco style and restored in 2000, is owned and operated by the city, which describes it as an "architectural gem". The building includes Native American design elements, including swastikas with right facing arms. It was nearly torn down in 1977, the same year the KiMo was listed on the National Register of Historic Places.

In 1907, the Corn Palace in Mitchell, South Dakota, featured a design that had a swastika on one of the towers as an "Indian good luck sign". Each year the exterior is covered with elaborate murals made of South Dakota corn, grain and grasses. The building is the centrepiece of a historic district that is listed on the National Register of Historic Places.

In Rapid City, South Dakota, there are swastikas in the lobby of the Hotel Alex Johnson, which opened in 1928. They are decorations honouring the Native American culture of Western South Dakota. The hotel is listed on the National Register of Historic Places.

The Weston building on the campus of Williams College in Massachusetts features left facing, tilted swastika brick patterns. The building was originally a fraternity with a charter that banned Jews and non-Caucasians. The college uses it for language classes to ensure regular use by different cultures, and built a Jewish religious centre behind it.

The Shaffer Hotel in Mountainair, New Mexico, features both right and left facing swastika designs among its many Native American graphics. It has been listed on the National Register of Historic Places since 1978. As of 2016, it is closed.

The Perelman Building was completed in 1928 as the headquarters of the Fidelity Mutual Life Insurance Company but is now part of the Philadelphia Museum of Art. Swastikas are visible in the elaborate decorative scheme, credited to Lee Lawrie. The building was listed on the National Register of Historic Places in 1973.

The Entrance to the Philadelphia Museum of Art features a walkway frieze with a swastika meander pattern. The first section of the current building was completed in 1928.

A Philadelphia fire station built in 1927 became controversial when local residents petitioned to remove a swastika design resembling the German Military Iron Cross. The township Commissioners, a majority of whom are Jewish, voted in 1998 to deny the petition, a position supported by local representatives of the Anti-Defamation League and Jewish Community Relations Council. "A symbol's meaning, they say, is tied to its context."

The Augustan Society Headquarters and Library, built in 1916 in the Mojave Desert in Daggett, California, includes Native American swastika designs. The non-profit is "An International Genealogical, Historical Heraldic and Chivalric Society".

The 1926 Pueblo Revival—Spanish Colonial Revival—Mission Revival Style architecture of the Orcutt residence is decorated with Native American swastikas. It is located at the Orcutt Ranch Horticulture Center in West Hills, Los Angeles, California. The property has been designated a Los Angeles Historic-Cultural Monument.

Both right and left facing swastikas appear in disks near the top of columns on the Alexander & Baldwin building in Honolulu, Hawaii, built in 1929 and added to the National Register of Historic Places in 1979.

Pedestrian pavements with swastika impressions can be found at Indian Village, Detroit, a historic neighbourhood on the city's east side. The concrete impressions, dated 1914, bear the word "Quality" and the name of the construction company.

A swastika design is visible on the exterior of the Detroit, Michigan downtown public library, built in 1931. A local website notes "They were a popular item in certain Deco designs, and many are used in architecture throughout Downtown Detroit. They also can be seen quite often on floor tiles in church buildings."

The First Chinese Church of Christ in Honolulu, Hawaii, dedicated in 1929, features wooden pews with swastika carvings. The church website says they "depict the wan-zi, an ancient Chinese symbol of 10,000 years of eternal blessedness. Sadly, Hitler reversed this symbol and made it into his Nazi swastika."

The Carlton Apartments in Houston, Texas, built in 1918, features an entryway framed by tiles with various patterns including the swastika.

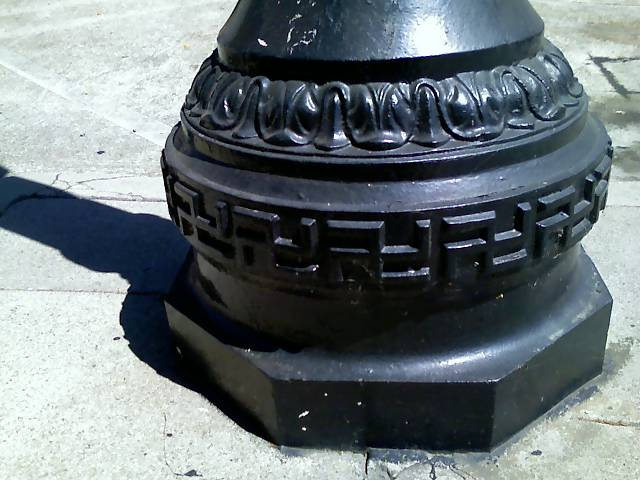
Southern California lamppost

Throughout Southern California, lampposts made by the Union Metal Company of Canton, Ohio, circa 1920 featured swastikas on the base.

==== Efforts to remove historical swastikas ====
More than 900 cast iron lampposts decorated with swastikas remain in place in downtown Glendale, California. The lampposts were manufactured in Canton, Ohio and installed in the 1920s. In 1995 the city responded to complaints that the lampposts should be removed. The city attorney's response included "...research has revealed that the symbol itself was not uncommon in Judaism. The symbol itself has been found to appear in ancient synagogues as well as being found as a symbol appearing on sarcophagus in Roman catacombs." Cost to replace the lampposts was estimated at $3 million. The Glendale Historical Society "has recommended preservation of the lampposts to the maximum extent possible."

Similar swastika designs can be seen on the lampposts outside the old San Francisco Mint, built in 1873, and listed on the National Register of Historic Places since 1976 and currently serves as a museum.

The California State Historical Resources Commission nominated the Los Gatos Union High School for listing on the National Register of Historic Places in 2003. Historic Architect A. G. Dill thanked the commission. "Ms. Dill stated that her office was galvanized in 1999 when the new school principal attempted to chisel off the Greek key design because it had a swastika pattern. The school was built in 1925 prior to the Nazis taking over the symbol. Educators need to be educated."

The New Mexico State University yearbook continued under the title The Swastika in honour of the traditional meaning of the symbol.

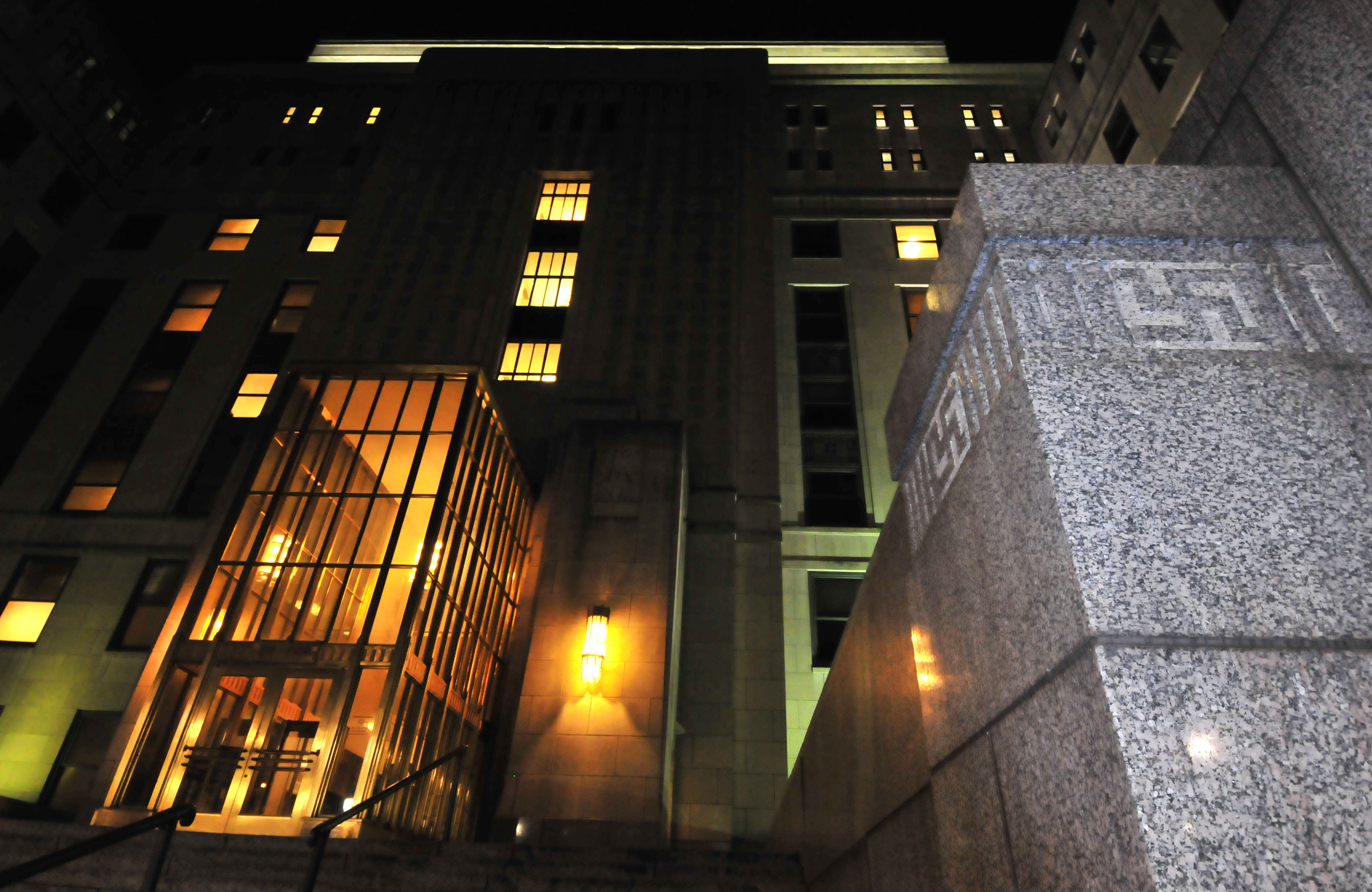
Jefferson County Courthouse

In January 1999, Civil Rights groups asked the Jefferson County, Alabama Commission to remove nine swastikas carved into stone pillars at the county courthouse in Birmingham, Alabama. The building was completed in 1931 with symbols featuring both left and right facing arms. A commission aide said officials would not consider the request unless there were "an awful lot of folks worrying us."

The restored Balboa Park Hospitality House in San Diego became controversial when swastika symbols were discovered on five light fixtures. The design dates to 1935. Park officials welded metal plates over the swastikas after a protest by the Anti-Defamation League. The San Diego Historical Society notes that the lamps were donated by a German American group and were intended to represent Nazi symbols. The nearby Balboa Park tea house had previously featured swastika decorations in 1915.

A hand-carved wooden horse with swastikas on its saddle was removed from the 1921 Jantzen Beach Carousel, listed on the National Register of Historic Places.

==== Swastika tiles ====
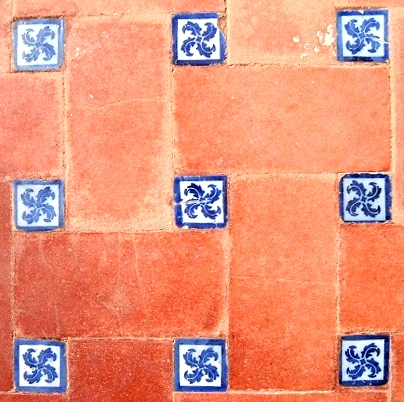
Noble floor of or José Relvas House, designed by Raul Lino da Silva

Ceramic tiles with a swastika design were produced by a number of North American manufacturers in the late 19th and early 20th centuries. They were often installed in repeating patterns or in combination with related ancient and/or geometric symbols. In western architecture, pre-World War II swastika tiles are typically a minor decorative element and have only become prominent when their original intent or symbolic meaning has been re-interpreted.

The Bay Pines Veterans Administration Home and Hospital Historic District in St. Petersburg, Florida, built prior to World War II, has a swastika tile floor in a building that has served US veterans of World War II. The Mediterranean Revival style VA hospital buildings were completed in the early 1930s and are listed in the National Register of Historic Places. The government facility does not plan to remove the tiles and has installed informational plaques and presented a historic preservation plan to the Florida State Historical Preservation Office. The commander of a local Jewish Veterans Post told a local reporter "I would say it should not be touched, ...It's a historical item. It had nothing to do with Nazi Germany".

Small swastika tiles decorate arcade porch columns at the San Antonio Landa Branch Library, part of the San Antonio Public Library system. The building was constructed in the late 1920's and was originally home to one of San Antonio’s most influential Jewish women. The Monte Vista Historical Association is located in the building.

Swastika tiles adorn the New Jersey Statehouse in Trenton, in a room built in the 1930s. A newspaper article in The Press of Atlantic City notes that the statehouse tiles were created by the local Mueller Mosaic Company. Led by Herman Carl Mueller, the firm used an innovative technique that combined glazing and deep carving to create a photographic-like sense of depth. The tiles were installed throughout the United States and Canada. The swastika design was only one of many different symbols featured in the Mueller catalogue.

Fourteen swastika tiles were removed in 2024 from a 1927 building owned by the Episcopal Diocese of New Jersey in Trenton. The tiles were also from the local Mueller Mosaic Tile Company. The floor also included tiles with crosses, fleur-de-lis, anchors, diamonds and circles.

A Detroit columnist in 2015 began a campaign to remove swastika tiles from the Detroit Athletic Club, designed by Jewish architect Albert Kahn in 1915.

Reprints of tile catalogues, including the 1930 Mueller Mosaic Faience Tile Inserts catalogue are available from the non-profit California based Tile Heritage Foundation. Swastika tiles are also featured in the 1920 catalogue from Wheatley Pottery Company of Cincinnati Ohio, the 1928 catalogue from the Cambridge-Wheatley Company of Covington, Kentucky, which marketed Wheatley tiles and a 1930s catalogue from the Franklin Pottery Company of Lansdale, Pennsylvania.

The Mueller tiles with swastika design can be found at the St. James Episcopal Church (1927), and the Immanuel Presbyterian Church (1928). in Los Angeles.

Mueller swastika tiles created controversy among tenants at the Brooklyn, New York Greenwood Heights apartment complex, built in 1928. The tile floors throughout the building include tile crowns, crosses, and interlocking circles in addition to swastikas. The building's landlord has indicated they have no plan to remove the tiles.

In May 2006, five terra cotta tiles were removed from St. Mary's Cathedral in St. Cloud Minnesota, serving the oldest parish in the community. The upper church, constructed in the late 1920s, included a number of decorative tiles including a series of ten that depicted ancient forms of the cross. Located near the eaves, the tiles represented the crux gammata, also known as the Gammadion, "hooked cross", with a wooden rough-hewn texture, with leaves and fruit in the background that resemble olives. The five swastika tiles alternated with a related design featuring the Lauburu or "Basque cross". The upper church's final design was created by the local architectural firm of Nairne W. Fisher, who had fought against Germany during World War I and in 1934 designed a "War Memorial" building in Devils Lake (North Dakota). Three of the tiles were destroyed in the process of removal; one was put on permanent display at the church. The removal was prompted in part by criticism from some current and former faculty at St. Cloud State University, where the university's electronic diversity newsletter featured a series of articles that claimed by 1920 it was already "the symbol of Aryan conquest and mastery."

Other Catholic Cathedrals that include swastika tiles among their decorations include: Saint Joseph Cathedral, Wheeling, West Virginia, a Romanesque design by architect Edward J. Weber of Pittsburgh, completed in 1925; St. Colman's Cathedral, built between 1868 and 1925 overlooking the port city of Cobh Ireland. Christ Church Cathedral, New Zealand, constructed in the 1880s. The Cathedral of Tampico, Tamaulipas, completed in the late 19th century with additional remodelling. A tile floor at Hereford Cathedral in England is laid out in a swastika like pattern with arms pointed to the right. The floor at Amiens Cathedral in France features a right-facing swastika pattern with shortened arms, similar to the St. Cloud tiles. A popular tourist destination, Amiens is protected as a UNESCO World Heritage Site.

The Plummer House in Rochester, Minnesota includes swastika tiles. The five-story home was constructed beginning in 1917 by Dr. Henry Plummer, a prominent figure in the history of the Mayo Clinic. The home was designed by Thomas Ellerbe, a second generation architect whose firm is now known as Ellerbe Becket. It has been listed on the National Register of Historic Places since 1975.

In 2008, school officials decided not to remove swastika floor tiles with left-facing arms from a Duluth, Minnesota elementary school built in 1929. A member of the city's Native American Commission noted that the nine tiles at the school entrances have roots in Native American symbolism. "It has absolutely nothing to do with the Nazi symbolism."

St. Columba's Catholic Church in Johnstown, Pennsylvania, was designed by Pittsburg architect John T. Cornes and completed in 1914 as a territorial church for English speaking immigrants. Various forms of the cross are represented in the sanctuary's mosaic floor, including swastika designs. A local art enthusiast notes "People don't realise that the swastika was not always a sign of hatred and horror; it originally symbolised good lock and fortune".

Swastika floor tiles were removed from the St. Lawrence Catholic Church in Lafayette, Indiana in March 1996, after they were discovered during renovation of the church entrance. The church was built in the early 1920s.

The Arizona Department of Agriculture building in Phoenix, Arizona, built in 1930, features swastika tiles in a pattern near its roofline.

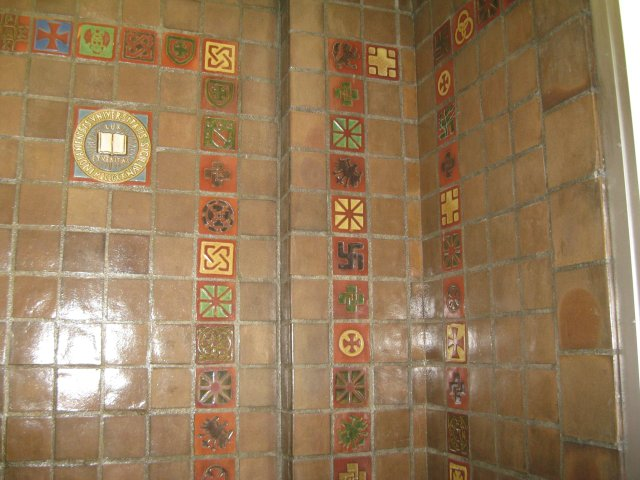
Indiana University School of Public Health-Bloomington swastikas

The School of Public Health-Bloomington Building at Indiana University featured decorative Native American-inspired swastika tilework on the walls of the foyer and stairwells on the southeast side of the building. In response to a complaint about the tiles, "The president of the university sent a letter to the student, which explained the history of the symbol and the context in which it was placed in the School of Public Health-Bloomington (formerly HPER) building when it was built in 1917, prior to use of the symbol by the Nazis. The student appreciated the response". In November 2013, a new appeal to remove the symbols appeared in the university's student paper. The tiles were removed in July, 2019.

A late 1800s swastika tile floor was discovered in an Indiana jewelry shop in early 2022 during remodeling.

The University of Montana's Diversity Advisory Council voted in December 2019 to remove a mirror-image swastika-like 'aristika' design in a former women's dormatory that dates to 1927, while acknowledging "The symbols were originally meant to celebrate Native American and east Asian culture." Student and faculty senates had previously approved similar resolutions. The Montana Historical Society must be consulted prior to removal.

Swastika floor tiles appear in Breidenbaugh Hall, at Gettysburg College in Pennsylvania, built in 1927.

In November 1998 the Rome, New York, Sentinel newspaper reported that swastika tiles were removed from the Gansevoort Elementary School where they had survived on a school floor for 84 years. A Sentinel editorial noted that similar tiles were left untouched at a Jewish synagogue, Temple Beth El, in nearby Utica, New York "because the connotation to the Jewish congregation is not that of the Third Reich."

Swastika tiles in a condominium lobby floor in White Plains, New York, became the subject of a television news story and Internet postings in September 2011. The housing complex's management indicated "the tile was installed before WWII when the building was built in 1924, noting it had never received a complaint before."

A local news report in April 2016 prompted Catholic Church officials to immediately remove four swastika tiles from St. Agnes Cathedral in Rockville Centre, New York . The church was constructed in the early 1930s. The tiles had gone unnoticed for more than 80 years in a little used church alcove.

Swastika tiles in a courthouse floor in El Dorado, Arkansas became controversial in late 2016 after a former city council member complained. The small ceramic swastika tiles were one of dozens of different symbols in the floor. The courthouse was built in 1928 and listed on the National Register of Historical Places in 1983. A county judge indicated the tiles would be left in place.

In 1991, the Shorewood, Wisconsin school board voted to remove tiles with swastika engravings from their high School physical education building.

The Reuters News Agency reported in 1990 that the seaside community of Hull, Massachusetts voted to remove swastika tiles from their town hall floor, built in 1923, after complaints from the New England Director of the Jewish Defense League. The removal went forward in spite of opposition from a local Jewish synagogue.

Multicoloured swastika tiles are visible on the exterior of a Chinese restaurant at the Country Club Plaza in Kansas City Missouri. The building dates to the early 1930s. The editor of a local Jewish publication reacted by saying "You know, the swastika does predate Nazism. Short of any Nazi context, I don't think you should find it offensive."

The foyer of Central High School in Pueblo, Colorado, features right-facing swastikas set into the tile floor. The school was built in 1906 and was added to the National Register of Historic Places in 1979.

The Bonneville County Courthouse in Idaho Falls, Idaho has swastika floor tiles that have been alternately covered up and painted over. An architectural historian for the Idaho State Historical Society noted that the symbols could be removed even though the courthouse is listed on the National Register of Historic Places. In September 2009, court officials decided to leave the tiles in place.

The San Mateo County History Museum, in Redwood City, California, is housed in the former county courthouse. It was built in 1910 and designed "to look as impressive as San Francisco City Hall." The mosaic tile floor in the rotunda includes swastika designs. The building is listed on the National Register of Historic Places and the museum is accredited by the American Alliance of Museums.

The A.K. Smiley Public Library in Redlands, California, built in 1894, includes a swastika tile floor design. The building has been listed on the National Register of Historic Places since 1976, and a California State Historic Landmark in 1990.

Swastika tiles are visible at the San Diego Mission Beach Plunge swimming pool, which opened in 1925.

The Ernst Cafe in the New Orleans Warehouse district has a 1902 swastika pattern tile floor, with left facing symbols. The restaurant's web page notes that Adolf Hitler was a teenager when the floor was installed.

The Moorish style Majestic Theater in East St. Louis, Illinois, built in 1928, features hundreds of coloured tiles with a variety of geometric designs including numerous swastikas with arms pointing to the right. The theatre was added to the National Register of Historic Places in 1985 but has fallen into disrepair.

The Plays and Players Theatre, built in 1912 in Philadelphia, Pennsylvania, has coloured swastika floor tiles. The theatre was added to the National Register of Historic Places in 1973.

The 116th Street–Columbia University station of the New York City Subway features a ceramic mosaic design with a border of swastikas, which dates back to the station's 1904 opening.

In early 2016, the board of directors of the Longview Community Church in Longview, Washington debated removing swastika tiles from the church, constructed in 1925, and added to the National Register of Historic Places in 1985.

A popular California summer camp near Los Altos, California closed suddenly in early June 2022 after many staff resigned in protest over building tiles that included the swastika. The original owners of the camp property obtained the swastika tiles, along with other Buddhist symbols, during an Asian honeymoon in 1913, and installed the tiles in their home in 1929. The nonprofit farm and wilderness preserve responded by removing the tiles from public view but staff resigned two days before action was taken. The Hidden Villa camp website lists Values that include opposition to discrimination and credits itself with creating the first interracial residential summer camp.

==== Miscellaneous usage ====
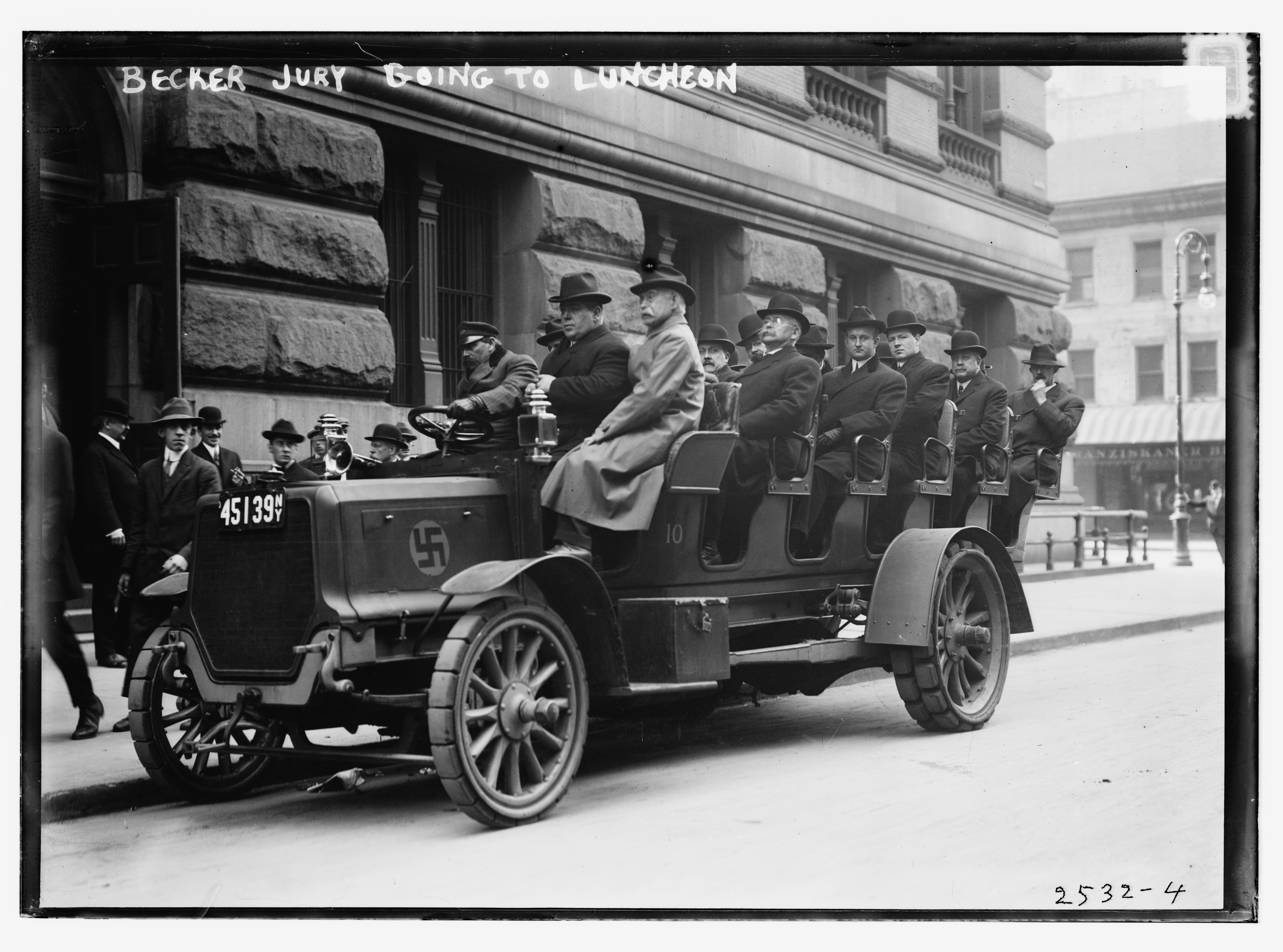
The jury in the Rosenthal murder case leaving for lunch in a charabanc adorned with the symbol; New York, 1912–1914

- The 44-foot luxury yacht Lady Isabel is the centrepiece of the Wisconsin-Built Boat Gallery at the Wisconsin Maritime Museum in Manitowoc. Built in 1907, it was known for decades as the "Swastika", meaning "Well Being". Swastika symbols are visible on the front of a building in the historic area of Manitowoc, built in 1894 that originally served as a hardware store.
- The "Swastika Series" is a name given to a soil type in New Mexico by the U.S. National Cooperative Soil Survey.
- In December 2007, the Minneapolis Institute of Arts displayed a period room decorated for Christmas that included candlesticks with swastika motifs. The room's interior design had been preserved since 1905 and was created by a Minneapolis decorator. "The symbols as seen in the Duluth Room have no Third Reich connotations, but rather refer to the ancient symbol."
- Jewish artist Edith Altman, whose family fled Germany in the late 1930s, produced a travelling exhibit entitled "Reclaiming the Symbol" that "strives to reclaim the star, the cross and the swastika to their positive use.". The exhibit has included excerpts from the book "Swastika the Earliest Known Symbol and its Migrations", written by Thomas Wilson, then curator of the National Museum of Natural History. Wilson died in 1902 and is buried in the District of Columbia, with a gravestone that includes a swastika.
- The Smithsonian's National Air and Space Museum in Washington D.C. displays the original propeller spinner from Charles Lindbergh's aeroplane Spirit of St. Louis, manufactured in early 1927. A swastika, left-facing, was painted on the inside of the spinner cone along with the names of all the Ryan Aircraft Co. employees who built the aeroplane, presumably as a message of good luck prior to Lindbergh's solo Atlantic crossing.
- University faculty at Catholic Jesuit St. Louis University voted to remove a painting by Italian priest Renato Laffranchi in 2004. The painting symbolised four rivers flowing from the Garden of Eden, with gardens in four quadrants, and resembled a swastika with shortened arms. The university's president refused to remove the painting prior to its scheduled annual rotation.

== Oceania ==
=== Australia ===
Sydney has two notable buildings using the swastika as an architectural element. The 1920s-era Dymocks Building in George Street includes a multi-level shopping arcade, the tiled floors of which incorporate numerous left-facing swastikas. A brass explanatory sign is affixed to the wall near the elevator doors on each floor of the building, and refers to it as a "fylfot", emphasising that its use in the building pre-dates any Nazi connotations or usage. In nearby Circular Quay, the Customs House also has fylfot tiles in the front entrance area dating from the same period, with a plaque to explain the symbols.

During World War I, Australia's 3rd Division led by John Monash took the swastika as its group sign to be used as identifying marks on vehicles and other equipment.

== South America ==
=== Argentina ===
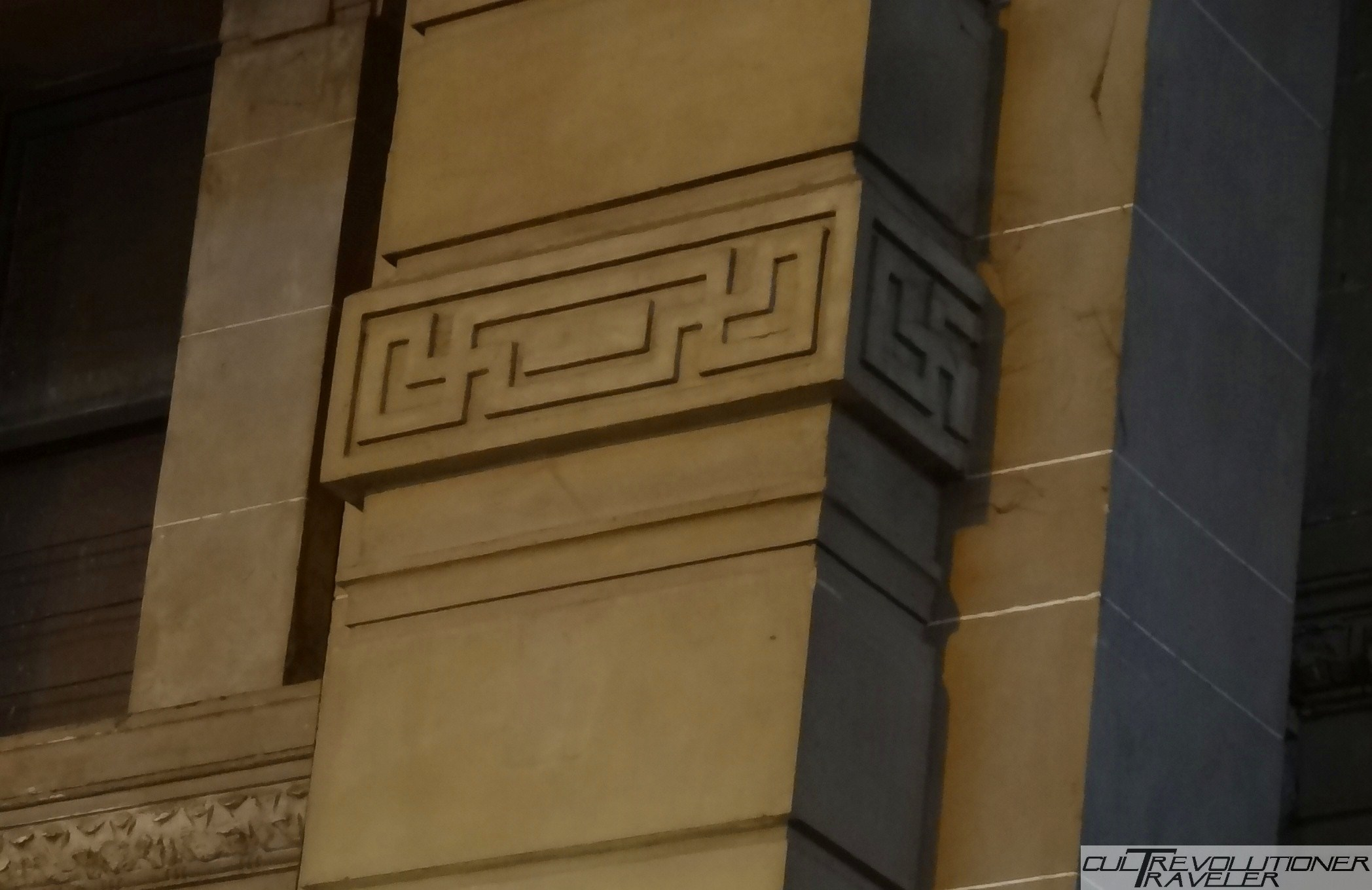
Detail of the columns in Retiro station in Argentina

Built in 1915, there are several columns at the train station of Retiro in Buenos Aires are decorated with joint swastikas.
