= Fillet (heraldry) =

Heraldic element

Fillet supporting chief (Fr. Divise or filet en chef)

In English-language heraldry, the fillet is considered a diminutive of the chief. It is defined as occupying one fourth the width of the chief and typically positioned at its bottom edge. When so positioned the chief is blazoned as supported by the fillet; but, when the chief is charged by the fillet, as when the fillet positioned at its top edge or middle, the chief is blazoned as surmounted. Another term for the former, supported, is sustained. In French heraldry, terms for this charge are divise and filet en chef. The term chef retrait has also been used. The fillet or divise placed beneath the chief is of a different tincture than the field, evidently to avoid violations of the rule of tincture (see Berry 1828).

There are other uses of the English fillet that are similar to its use above as diminutive of the chief. The term is used by some for a diminutive of the fess narrower than the bar, as a synonym for barrulet. It is also used by some more generally for a narrow band as charge that can be positioned variously on the field—as a diminutive of the bend, as synonym of riband as well as the fess, as synonym of barrulet. This latter use parallels that of the cognate term filet in French heraldry, where it is possible to speak of the filet "en fasce, en pal, en bande, en barre, en croix, en sautoir, en chevron, en parle" (fillet in fess, in pale, in bend, in bend sinister, in cross, in saltire, in chevron, in pall). (See #Fillet as adjective below.)

Such uses of the term fillet in English (or filet in French) often employ it as term for a component element of other devices such as the cross parted and fretted, the ordinary the fret, or the variation of the field fretty. 'Fretted' and 'fretty' refer to the interlacing of the fillets. The Jumelle (Eng. bar gemel, etc.) and Tierce are other charges also said to be composed of filets. The cottise, or cost, has been described as having the "appearance of a fillet placed beside the principal ordinary" and at least one author terms it a fillet. The pentagram has even been described as a "star reduced to an interlaced fillet".

This use of the term, as the diminutive of an ordinary or component of a complex charge, is to be distinguished from other uses of the term fillet in heraldry. See section #Other uses of fillet in a heraldic context below.

== Fillet as adjective ==
In English-language heraldry, diminutives of the cross, saltire, and pall reduced to one-fourth the thickness of the ordinary are known as the fillet cross, fillet saltire, and fillet pall. The adjective 'fillet' is used to denote a mode of diminution achieved by a reduction in thickness, to typically one-fourth that of the ordinary, without any corresponding reduction in the extent of the charge, in terms of length or width, or both. The fillet cross and fillet saltire occupy the full length and breadth field, as the cross and saltire as ordinaries do. In French heraldry, there is also the filet en pairle, or 'fillet pall'. Other diminutives of ordinaries reduced the thickness of a fillet (1/4 or less of the ordinary) have more specific names proper to themselves in both English and French heraldry. In French heraldry, the 'fillet bordure', adhering to the outer edges of the field in the same manner as the bordure, is the filière. In English heraldry, the 'fillet chevron' is the couple-close.

== Filleting and fimbriation ==
The terms fillet and fimbriation share etymological roots with words associated with clothing, sewing and stitching. The word fillet derives from the Middle English and Old French filet, a diminutive of thread. But the heraldic use may derive more proximately from use of the term for an item of clothing, a headband of white silk or linen worn to indicate sovereignty. In its practical inspiration dating to the Age of Chivalry, as a cloth worn around the helmets of knights, sometimes by sons of nobles as a mark of cadency, the fillet is related to another heraldic charge, the lambel or label. But the meaning of the word fillet extends to bands of metal historically worn around the head as marks of distinction, as crowns. For its part, fimbriate derives from the Latin for 'fibers, fringe, and thread' and more proximately from the word for the skirt or hem of a garment, "implying an ordinary or charge bordered all round". The use of the term 'fimbriation' for the bordering of ordinaries like crosses and bends that extends only to the edge of the field and does not fully encompass the charge, though common, is considered by authorities like William Berry to be likely mistaken.

== Other uses of fillet in a heraldic context ==
Aside from the use of the term fillet for the diminutive of an ordinary as a narrow band, the term is also used in a figurative-representational manner drawing on the meanings of fillet discussed above, as ribbon, cloth headband, or band of metal. In the first case, it is used to describe a decorative element of an achievement of arms, the figurative representation of a ribbon entwined around a helmet. The fillet in this sense is also frequently incorporated (twisted into) the torse. In the second, the term is used for representations of cloth wrapped around the heads of 'Moors' or 'Saracens'. When used thusly, the human figures portrayed with a candida fascia, after the diadem of the Roman kings, are blazoned diadameté. A third use, resembling the two preceding, is for the representation of a band of cloth or bandage used to bundle a sheaf of wheat or arrows together. Finally, the term is used for representations of a metal band, of gold, as a plain crown or as a component of a more elaborate crown. A derivative of this usage, is the use of fillet to describe a design component of some heraldic representations of the fleur-de-lis, such as that seen on the Flag of Quebec or the Flag of the Republic of Bosnia and Herzegovina (see section #Band as design element of fleur-de-lis below).

== Gallery ==
=== Coats of arms ===
Gouzangrez, France

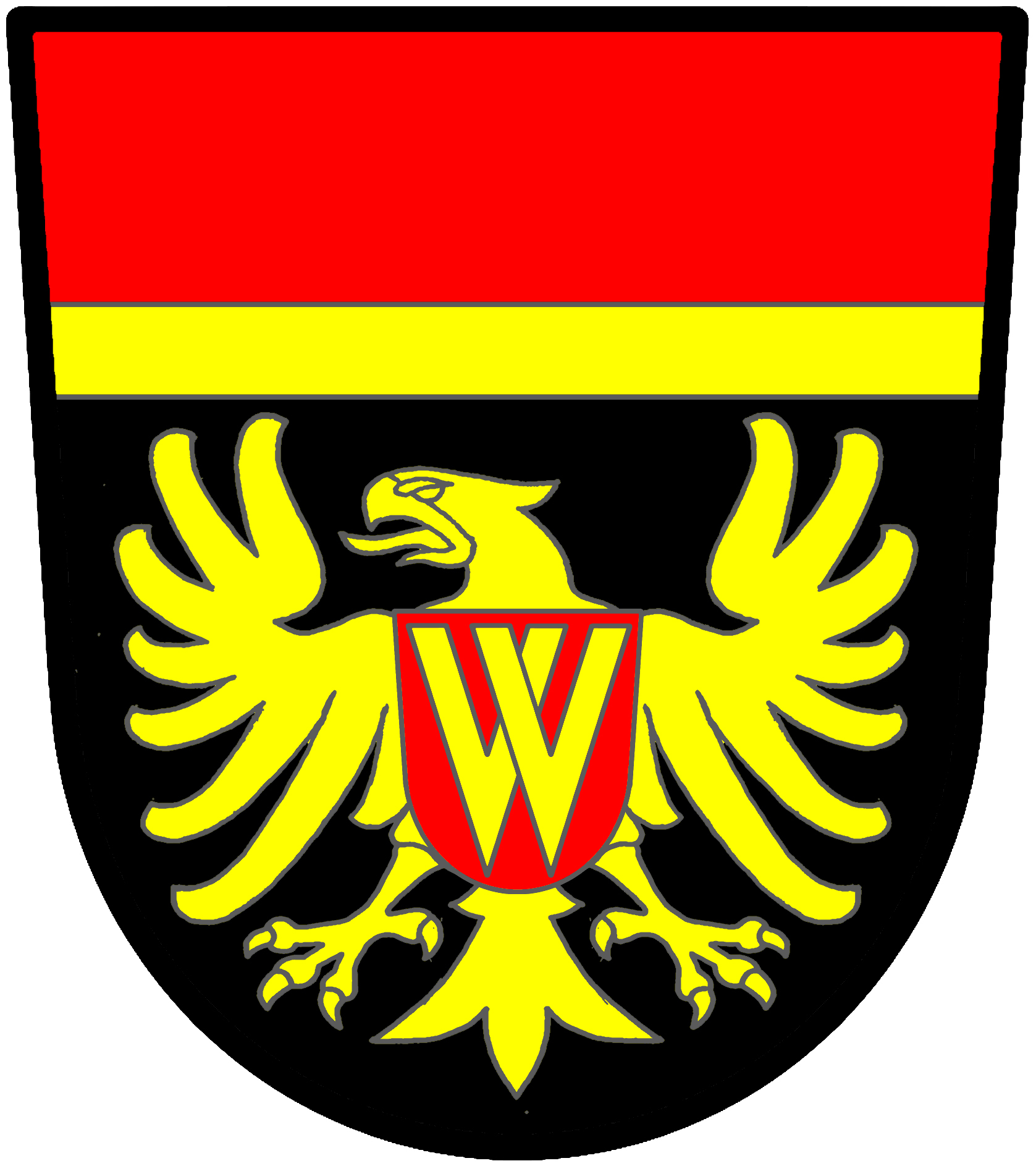
Wing Riders of South Africa

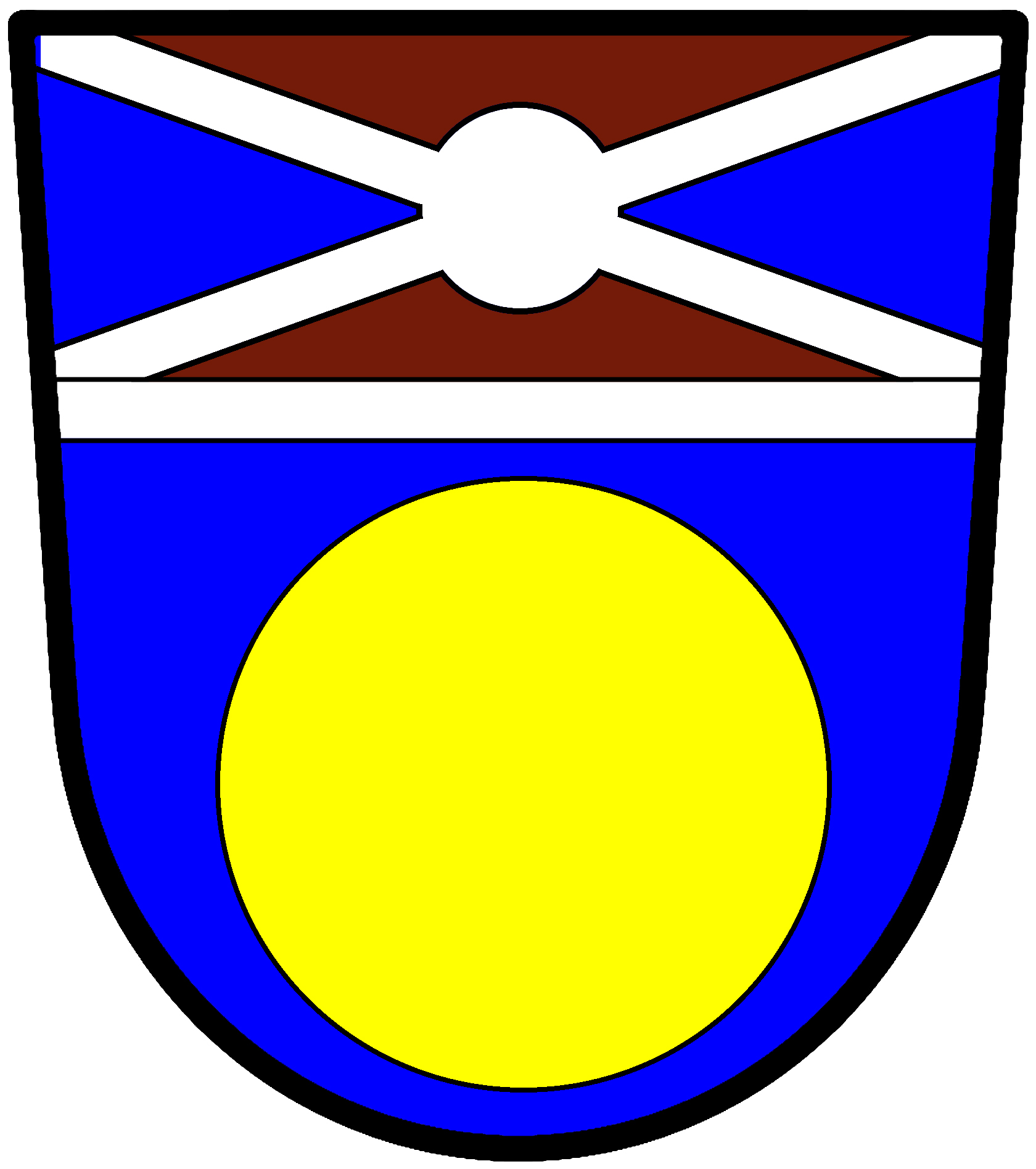
Arms of de Jong, Fillet with fillet saltire

See also the Coat of arms of the Harvard Medical School, blazoned as "sustained by a fillet compony".

==== Fillet in base ====
Baons-le-Comte, France

==== Fillet cross and fillet saltire ====
Drap, France

Bretigny, France

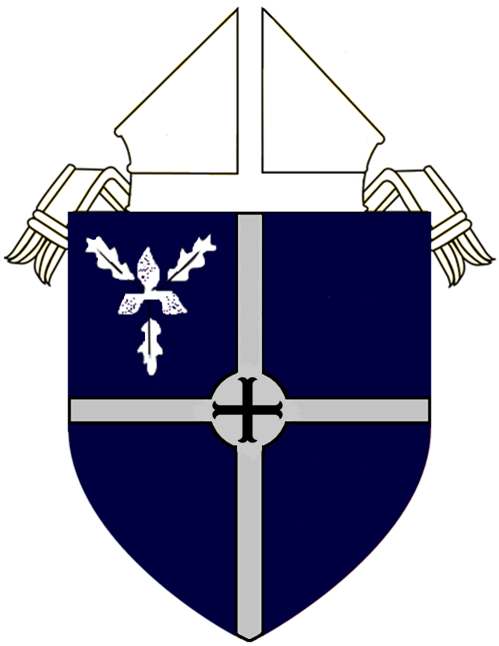
Roman Catholic Diocese of Bismarck

Roman Catholic Diocese of Brooklyn

Coat of arms of Dominica
(cross fillet counterchanged)

Cénac, France

==== As component of crosses parted and fretted ====
Arms of Wilfrid Scott-Giles

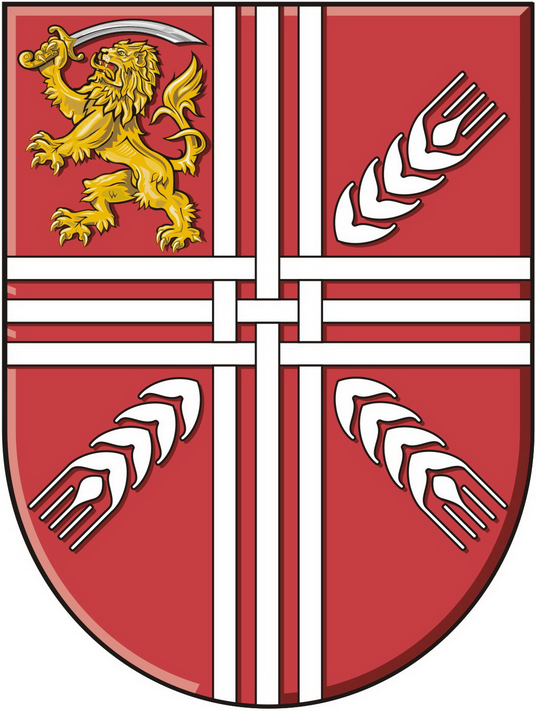
Opština Nova Crnja, Serbia

Hjelmeland, Norway

==== As component of fretty variation of the field ====
Famille Gaudin de Villaine

Rushen Abbey, Isle of Man

Saint-Élier

Guer

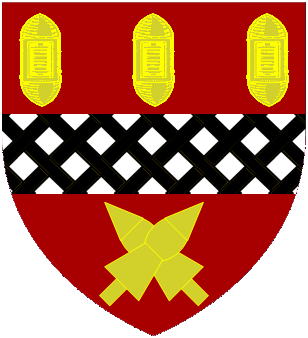
The Textile Institute

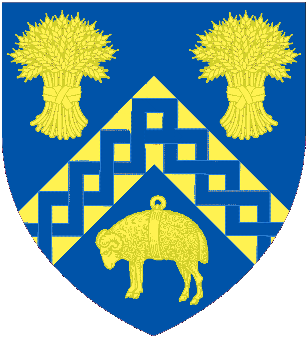
Viscount Lambert

=== On flags ===
The use of the fillet as diminutive of the chief is, on flags, quite rare. However, the fillet as narrow band is used in a similar manner to offset other ordinaries like the base or sides (for examples, see the section #Fillet-adjacent diminutives* below). There are examples of the fillet as narrow band used on its own as a diminutive of charges such as the fess or bend (see same). There are examples of the fillet cross, fillet saltire, and fillet bordure (filière). And there are examples of the fillet used as component of other charges such as the Fret, the Jumelle, and the Tierce.

==== Fillet-adjacent diminutives* ====
===== Fillet pale, or endorse =====
Flag of Norman, Oklahoma, US

Flag of the former Zimbabwe Rhodesia (1979)

Flag of Tennessee, US

Flag of Jenks, Oklahoma, US

Flag of Mississippi, US

===== Fillet fess, or barrulet =====
Flag of Nauru

Flag of Tatarstan, Russian Federation

Flag of Dallas, Texas, US

Flag of the Kirghiz Soviet Socialist Republic

Flag of Mecklenburg-Vorpommern, Germany

===== Fillet in base =====
Flag of Chechen Republic, Russian Federation

Flag of the Lithuanian Soviet Socialist Republic, USSR

Flag of Sverdlovsk Oblast, Russian Federation

Proposed flag of Western Canada (escartelly in base)

====== Other barrulet as fimbriation ======
Flag of Botswana

Flag of the Gambia

Flag of North Korea

Flag of South Sudan

Flag of Suriname

Flag of Uzbekistan

Flag of Erie, Pennsylvania, US

NB: For the relation of filleting or 'filletation' to fimbriation, see #Filleting and fimbriation.

===== Fillet bend, or ribbon, riband =====
Flag of the Solomon Islands (sinister)

Flag of Aegina, Greece (sinister)

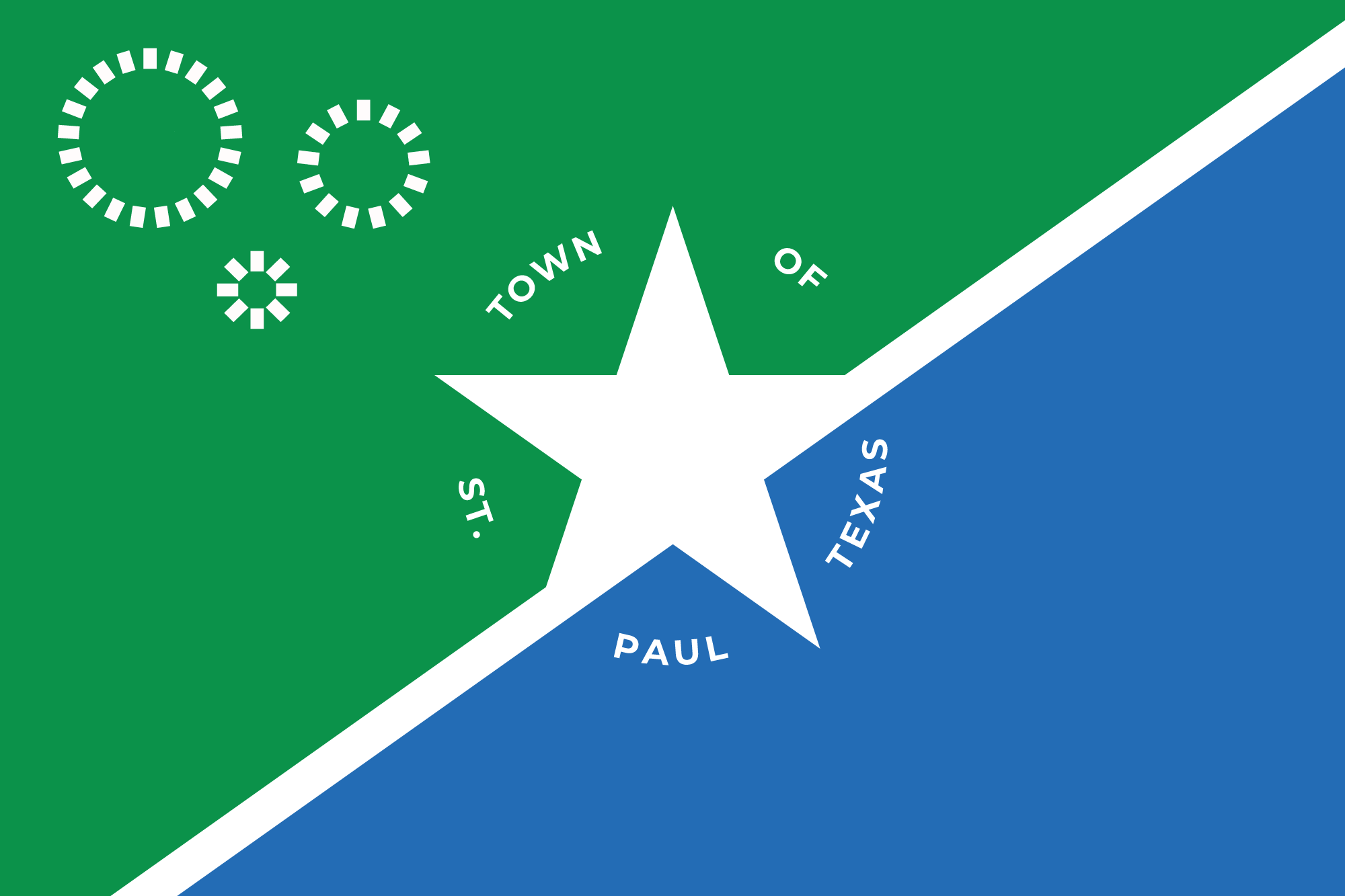
Flag St. Paul, Texas, US (sinister)

====== Other ribbon as fimbriation ======
Flag of the Democratic Republic of the Congo

Flag of Namibia

Flag of Tanzania

Flag of Trinidad and Tobago

NB: For the relation of filleting or 'filletation' to fimbriation, see #Filleting and fimbriation.

===== Fillet chevron, or couple-close =====
Flag of the Arapaho Nation

Flag of the Republic of Zimbabwe

Flag of Guyana

Flag of the Territory of American Samoa, US

Flag of Saint Lucia

===== Fillet bordure, or filière =====
Flag of Montenegro

Flag of Kyiv, Ukraine

Flag of Guam (United States)

Flag of the Cherokee Nation

Flag of Zaria, Nigeria
(in union with riband)

Flag of Sint Eustatius, Netherlands

===== Fillet orle or tressure =====
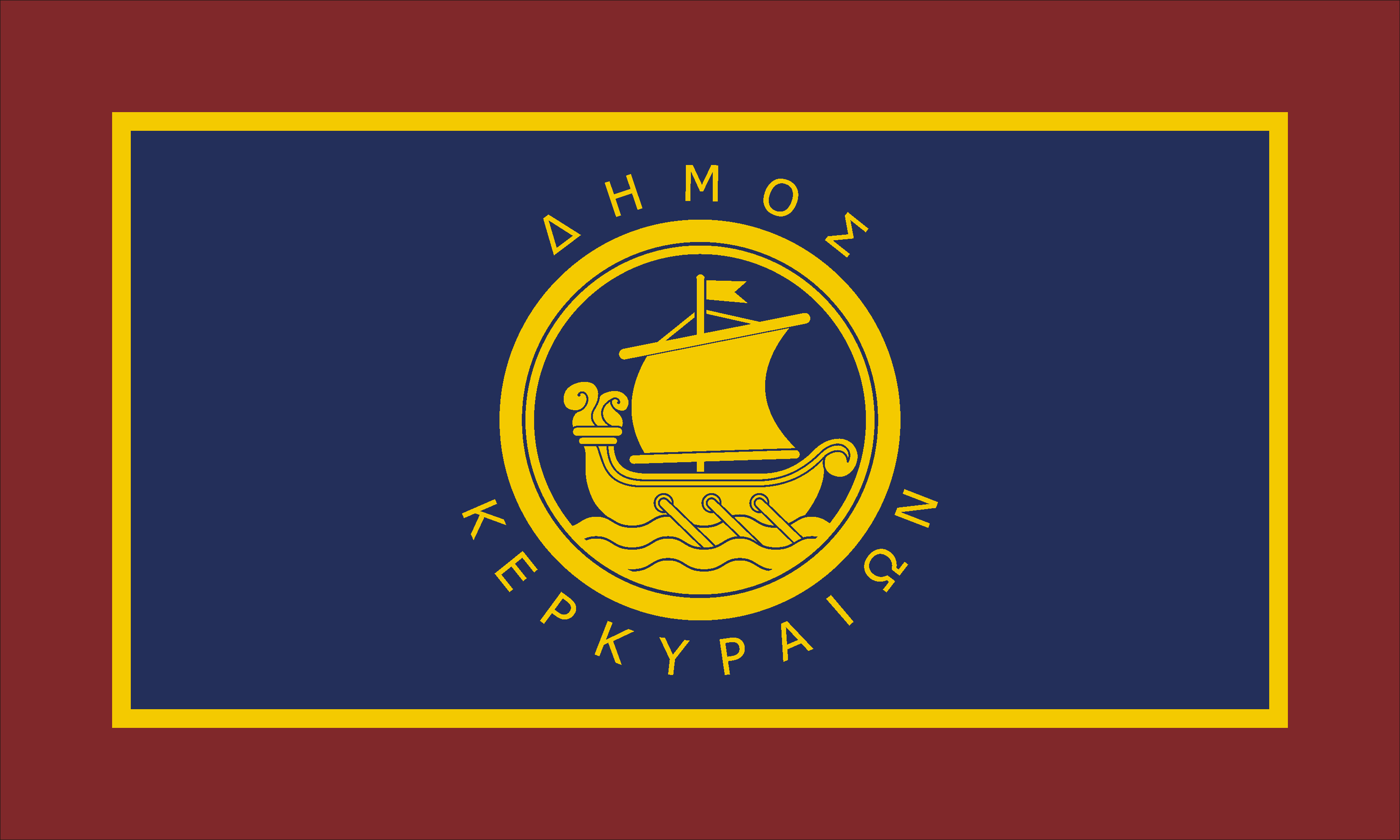
Flag of Corfu, Greece

Flag of Springfield, Massachusetts, US

Royal Banner of Scotland (double tressure, flory-counterflory)

See also Flag of Athens, Greece

==== Fillet cross and saltire ====
Flag of the city of Detroit, Michigan, USA

Flag of Leesburg, Virginia, US

Naval Jack and Naval Fortress Flag (1924), USSR

Flag of Zhytomyr Oblast, Ukraine

Flag of the city of Zhytomyr, Ukraine

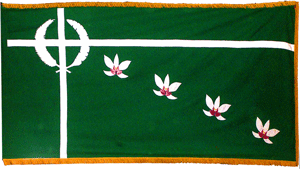
Flag of Southern Leyte, Philippines (Fillet offset cross enhanced)

Former flag of Seychelles (1976–1977)

House Flag of the Australasian United Steam Navigation Company

Flag of Clarksburg, West Virginia, US (embossed)

Autoracing Code 60 flag

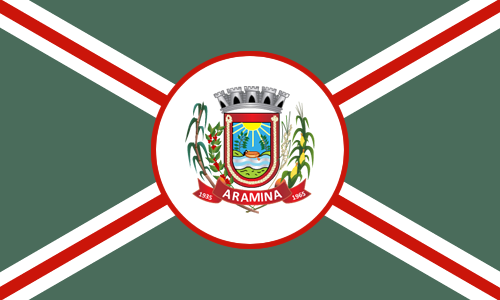
Flag of Aramina, São Paulo, Brazil

Flag of Newfoundland and Labrador, Canada

Flag of the Aromanians

==== Fillet pall ====
Flag of Vanuatu

Flag of the Republic of Tuva, Russian Federation (or pall voided)

Flag of St. Louis, Missouri, US (wavy)

*In English language vexillology, many of these would likely be blazoned as instances of fimbriation. For 'fillet esquarre' as border of canton on two sides, see Esquarre (heraldry).

==== As cost or single cottice ====
Flag of Altai Republic, Russia

Flag of Gdynia, Poland

Flag of Dodge City, Kansas, US

Guidon of the United States Coast Guard

Flag of Sierra Vista, Arizona, US

Flag of South Bend, Indiana, US

Flag of Alameda County, California, US

==== As component of Fret ====
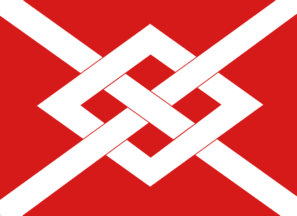
Flag of Karmøy, Rogaland county, Norway

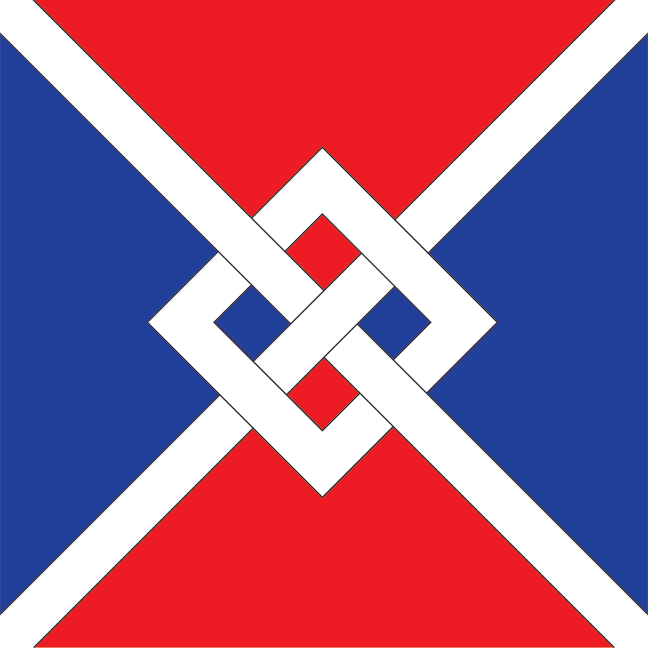
Flag of Koceljeva, Serbia

==== As component of cross parted and fretted ====
A proposed flag of the Finno-Ugric peoples

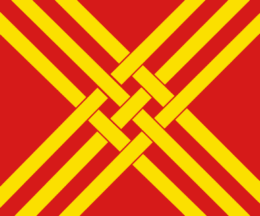
Flag of Hjelmeland, Rogaland county, Norway

Flag of Palmira, Táchira, Venezuela

==== As component of cross otherwise interlaced ====
Flag of the Nordic Flag Society

==== As component of Jumelle and similar ====
Flag of Aruba, Netherlands

==== As component of Tierce and other charges parted ====
Flag of the former Republic of Vietnam (South Vietnam), 1946–1975

Flag of Podgorica, Montenegro

Flag of Chișinău, Moldova

Flag of Ivanovo Oblast, Russian Federation

Flag of Hel, Puck County, Pomeranian Voivodeship, Poland

Former State flag of Jammu and Kashmir (1952–2019)

Flag of Yugorsk, Khanty–Mansi Autonomous Okrug, Russian Federation

Flag of Sioux Falls, South Dakota, US

Flag of Artigas, Uruguay

Flag of Salto Department Uruguay

==== Pentagram and hexagram as 'fillet star' ====
Flag of Morocco

Royal Flag of Morocco

Flag of Ethiopia

Flag of Nagasaki, Japan

Flag of Haaksbergen, Netherlands

Flag of Israel

NB: After the expression "star reduced to an interlaced fillet".

==== Other uses of term fillet ====
===== As headband or diadem =====
Flag of Corsica

Flag of Sardinia

===== As ribbon tying sheaf =====
Flag of Gy, Switzerland

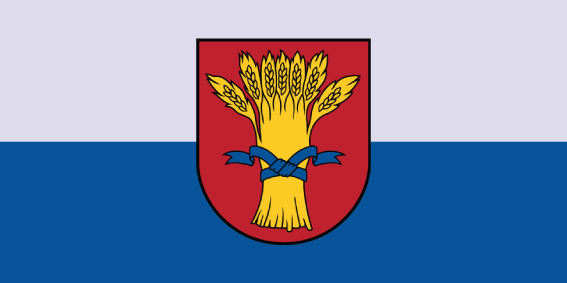
Flag of Rūjiena Municipality, Latvia

Flag of Morayshire, Scotland, United Kingdom

Flag of Gascony
(variant, unofficial)

===== Band as design element of fleur-de-lis =====
Flag of the former Republic of Bosnia and Herzegovina

Flag of Quebec

== See also ==
- Chief (heraldry)
- Fimbriation
- Esquarre (heraldry)
- Ordinary (heraldry)
- Charge (heraldry)
- Liste de pièces héraldiques
