= Esquire (disambiguation) =

Esquire is a title used to denote that a person has a specific social status.

Esquire may also refer to:

== Art, entertainment, and media ==
=== Magazines ===
- Esquire (magazine), an American men's fashion and lifestyle magazine
  - Esquire (UK Edition)

=== Music ===
- Esquire Records, an Australian record label
- Esquire Records (UK), a UK record label
- Esquire (band), an English progressive and symphonic rock band, or their debut album
- The Esquires, an American R&B group
- The Esquires (Canadian band)

=== Television ===
- Esquire Network, a former American television network

== Brands and enterprises ==
- Esquires, a coffee house chain in Canada, the United Kingdom, Ireland, and New Zealand
- Fender Esquire, electric guitar
- Toyota Esquire, a minivan produced between 2014 and 2021

== Other uses ==
- Esquire (heraldry)
- Gyron or esquire, an element in heraldry
- Esquire, the feudal title of a squire
