= Fylfot =

Anglo-Saxon and heraldic symbol

Left: fylfot. Right: gammadion.

The fylfot or fylfot cross (/ˈfɪlfɒt/ FILL-fot) and its mirror image, the gammadion, are types of truncated swastika, associated with medieval Anglo-Saxon culture. It is a cross with perpendicular extensions, usually at 90° or close angles, radiating in the same direction. However – at least in modern heraldry texts, such as Friar and Woodcock & Robinson (see § Bibliography) – the fylfot differs somewhat from the archetypal form of the swastika: always upright and typically with truncated limbs, as shown in the figure at right. The term's most commonly cited etymology derives from a 19th-century misreading of a manuscript, where it was an instruction to fill the foot of a stained-glass window.

== Etymology ==
The most commonly cited etymology for the word is that it comes from a belief, common among 19th-century antiquarians but based only on a dubious reading of the British Library's Lansdowne manuscript 874, that the word referred to the device – a swastika – shown in the main part of the image on of a stained-glass memorial window to Thomas Froxmere in the parish church of Droitwich Spa in Worcestershire. Subsequent analysis of the manuscript by lexicographer Henry Bradley explained that the word was an instruction to the painter to fill empty space at the foot. This etymology is often cited in modern dictionaries (such as the Oxford English Dictionary, the Collins English Dictionary and Merriam-Webster Online).

Walter William Skeat's 1882 A Concise Etymological Dictionary of the English Language defined the fylfot as "a peculiarly formed cross" and derived it from Old English:

The word simply means 'four-footed.' The A.S. feówer, four, when used in composition, took the curious form fyðer or fiðer, easily contracted to fyr-, and corrupted to fyl-.

The second edition of Skeat's An Etymological Dictionary of the English Language, completed in 1883, included an expanded etymology for fylfot which derived the word from Old English: *fyðer-fóte, lit. 'four-footed'. His definition was "a peculiarly formed cross, each arm being bent at right angles, always in the same direction" and continued that the figure was "Also called a rebated cross". After citing Frederick William Fairholt's Dictionary of Terms in Art and Charles Boutell's Heraldry, Skeat wrote of fylfot's etymology that it was:

Supposed to be (as is probable) a corruption of A. S. fíer-fóte, variant of fyðer-fóte, four-footed, in allusion to its shape The change from r to l is common, Cf. Swed. fyrfotad, four-footed. The A. S. fyðer-, i. e. 'four,' is only found in compounds; the usual form is feówer; cf. Goth. fidwor.

In the fourth edition, completed in 1909, Skeat accepted Bradley's 1897 etymology, replacing the mention of the rebated cross and the Anglo-Saxon etymology with:

Also called a gammadion. ... Modern; and due to a mistake. MS. Lansdowne 874, at leaf 190, has fylfot, meaning a space in a painted window, at the bottom, that fills the foot. This was erroneously connected (in 1842) with the 'gammadion,' as the cross was rightly named.

The Oxford Dictionary of English Etymology of 1966, edited by Charles Talbut Onions, defined the fylfot as the

antiquary's term for the cross cramponee, swastika, or gammadion, derived from a solitary ex. in British Museum MS Landowne 874, f. 190, the context of which suggests the interpretation 'fill-foot', i.e. a device for filling the foot of a painted window.

== History ==
The fylfot, together with its sister figures, the gammadion and the swastika, has been found in a great variety of contexts over the centuries. It has occurred in both secular and religious contexts in the British Isles, elsewhere in Europe, in Asia Minor and in Africa.

The gammadion is associated more with Byzantium, Rome and Graeco-Roman culture on the one hand, whereas the fylfot is associated more with Celtic and Anglo-Saxon culture on the other. Although the gammadion is very similar to the fylfot in appearance, it is thought to have originated from the conjunction of four capital 'Gammas' (Γ, the third letter of the Greek alphabet) but that the similarity of the symbols is coincidental.

Both of these swastika-like crosses may have been indigenous to the British Isles before the Roman invasion. Certainly they were in evidence a thousand years earlier but these may have been largely imports. They were certainly substantially in evidence during the Romano-British period with widespread examples of the duplicated Greek fret motif appearing on mosaics. After the withdrawal of the Romans in the early 5th century there followed the Anglo-Saxon and Jutish migrations.

The fylfot is known to have been very popular amongst these incoming tribes from Northern Europe, as it is found on artefacts such as brooches, sword hilts and funerary urns. Although the findings at Sutton Hoo are most instructive about the style of lordly Anglo-Saxon burials, the fylfot or gammadion on the silver dish unearthed there clearly had an Eastern provenance.

The fylfot was widely adopted in the early Christian centuries. It is found extensively in the Roman catacombs. An example of its usage is to be found in the porch of the parish church of Great Canfield, Essex, England. As the parish guide states, the fylfot or gammadion can be traced back to the Roman catacombs where it appears in both Christian and pagan contexts. More recently it has been found on grave-slabs in Scotland and Ireland. A particularly interesting example was found in Barhobble, Wigtownshire in Scotland.

Gospel books also contain examples of this form of the Christian cross. The most notable examples are probably the Book of Kells and the Lindisfarne Gospels. An example of this decoration occurs on the Ardagh Chalice.

From the early 14th century on, the fylfot was often used to adorn Eucharistic robes. During that period it appeared on the monumental brasses that preserved the memory of those priests thus attired. They are mostly to be found in East Anglia and the Home Counties.

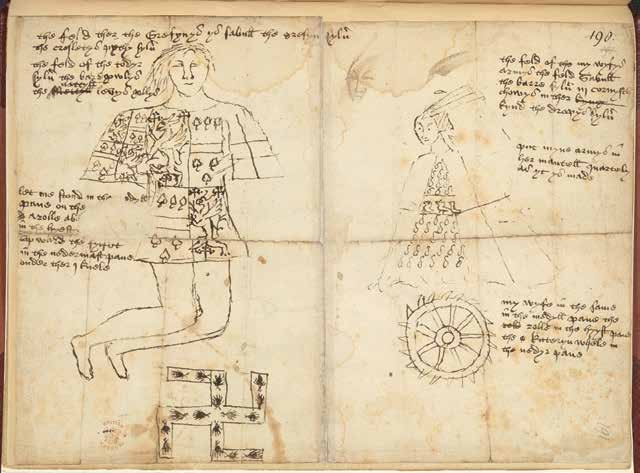
Thomas Froxmere's sketch for a memorial window for himself and his wife in the parish church of Droitwich Spa around 1480, in British Library Lansdowne manuscript 874, folio 191 recto. The text describes the swastika as a "fylfot".

In the 15th century, Thomas Froxmere designed stained glass memorial window for himself and his wife Catherine Cornwallis in the parish church of Droitwich Spa in Worcestershire. The window no longer exists, but Froxmere's sketch of it is preserved in the Lansdowne manuscripts in the British Library. The design has figures of him and his wife with annotations. The wife is depicted above a breaking wheel, and the husband, wearing an heraldic tabard, kneels above an ermine swastika. Froxmere's notes describe the symbol as a fylfot. His instructions to the glazier are: let me stond in the [m]edyll pane on the [...] a rolle abo[ve my heed] in the hyest [pane] upward the fylfot in the nedermost pane under ther I knele. According to Henry Bradley in 1897:

It seems to me very likely that fylfot in this passage (which it must be remembered is the sole authority for the word) is nothing more or less than "fill-foot," and means simply a pattern for filling up the foot of a compartment of a window. There is no reason to suppose that fylfot was the name of this particular device or pattern as distinguished from any other that might be used for the same purpose; for all we know, the word may even have been invented for the occasion, though the probability is rather that it was already a current term among the artists in stained glass.

— The derivation of "Fylfot", The Athenaeum, 1897

According to John Goodall in 1978, the swastika may evoke four set squares, relating to Thomas the Apostle, who was considered to have been a builder, while the wheel relates Catherine to her own namesake Catherine of Alexandria. According to Clive Cheesman in 2019, "In Froxmere's sketch, the swastika is not on a shield but is free-standing like a badge, and indeed there is no indication that it is meant to be hereditary, or heraldic, at all."

Probably its most conspicuous usage has been its incorporation in stained glass windows notably in Cambridge and Edinburgh. In Cambridge it is found in the baptismal window of the Church of the Holy Sepulchre, together with other allied Christian symbols, originating in the 19th century. In Scotland, it is found in a window in the Scottish National War Memorial in Edinburgh. The work was undertaken by Douglas Strachan and installed during the 1920s. He was also responsible for a window in the chapel of Westminster College, Cambridge. A similar usage is to be found in the Central Congregational Church in Providence, Rhode Island, USA, installed in 1893.

The fylfot is sometimes found on church bells in England. It was adopted by the Heathcote family in Derbyshire as part of their iconographic tradition in the 16th and 17th centuries. This is probably an example where pagan and Christian influence both have a part to play as the fylfot was amongst other things the symbol of Thor, the Norse god of thunder and its use on bells suggests it was linked to the dispelling of thunder in popular mythology.

== In heraldry ==
In modern heraldry texts, the fylfot is typically shown with truncated limbs, rather like a cross potent that's had one arm of each T cut off. It's also known as a cross cramponned, ~nnée, or ~nny, as each arm resembles a crampon or angle-iron (compare German: Winkelmaßkreuz). Examples of fylfots in heraldry are extremely rare, and the charge is not mentioned in Oswald Barron's article on "Heraldry" in most 20th-century editions of Encyclopædia Britannica. A 20th-century example (with four heraldic roses) can be seen in the Lotta Svärd emblem.

The addenda to James Parker's 1847 A Glossary of Terms Used in British Heraldry cited John Green Waller's and Lionel Waller's 1842 Monumental Brasses for his definition of "Fylfot; a very ancient figure of some unknown mystic signification". Parker cited the arms of Leonard Chamberlayne as they were drawn in the British Library's Harleian manuscript 1394 and gave the blazon as "Argent, a chevron between three fylfots gules". In the 1894 new edition of A Glossary of Terms Used in Heraldry, Parker described the fylfot as synonymous with the swastika and gammadion:

Arms of Leonard Chamberlayne: Argent a chevron between three swastikas gules. James Parker's 19th-century heraldic glossaries blazoned these swastikas as "fylfots".

Fylfot, [suggested to be a corruption of A.-S. fíer-fóte, (for fyðer-fóte) four-footed, in allusion to the four limbs]: an ancient figure to which different mystic meanings have been applied. All that can be said as to the occurrence in England is that it possibly was introduced from the East as a novel device; for a similar form is said to have been known in India and China long before the Christian era. It is called in the Sanskrit 'swastica,' and is found used as a symbol by Fylfot. the Buddhists. It is curious that the same kind of device appears in the Catacombs, and at the same time it is found on a coin of Ethelred, King of Northumbria, in the ninth century. It is probably similar to the ornament which is mentioned by Anastasius as embroidered on sacred vestments during the eighth and ninth centuries in Rome under the name of gammadion, which was so-called on account of the shape resembling four Greek capital Gammas united at the base. There is no reason to suppose that all these are derived from a common source, as such a device as this would readily suggest itself, just as the Greek pattern is frequent on work of all ages. It was on account of its supposed mystical meaning perhaps introduced into medieval vestments, belts, &c.; and though several instances of this use are found on brasses, only one instance occurs on coats of arms, namely, in those of CHAMBERLAYNE.

He also quoted his earlier blazon for these arms, adding that they are "so drawn in MS. Harleian 1394, pt. 129, fol. 9=fol. 349 of MS" and that "NB. In Harl. MS. 1415 this coat seems to be tricked with what are meant distinctly for three escallops". Parker also cited Froxmere's swastika in the Lansdowne manuscript 874:

One instance only of the name also has been observed in any MS. or book anterior to the eighteenth century, namely in the directions given by Francis Frosmere, c. 1480, apparently to designate his monogram F. F. (See MS. Lansdowne, No. 874.)

According to Clive Cheesman in 2017, these arms were ascribed to Leonard Chamberlaine in drawings in two manuscript armorials of the early modern period appended to copies of the Somerset Herald Robert Glover's heraldic visitation of Yorkshire in 1584/5, including Harleian manuscript 1394 and the College of Arms' Philpot manuscript 51. In the College of Arms' armorial "EDN Alphabet", these arms are blazoned in abbreviated form as "Chamberlaine A. a ⌃ bet: 3 卐. G.", without naming the chevron or the swastika-shaped device. Cheesman describes the blazon as "Argent a chevron between three swastikas gules", noting that "The abbreviated, note-form blazon does not offer a name for the cross, but simply indicates it with a picture ... as can be seen from other entries, the compiler habitually draws charges rather than naming them". According to Cheesman, a similar coat of arms with sable instead of gules is drawn, unnamed, in 16th-century copies of the 15th-century Portington Roll and "may possibly be a version of the coat of arms ascribed in Sir William Fairfax's widely copied 'Book of Yorkshire Arms'". Citing Glover's visitation, Cheesman writes that "This ascription is itself rather inexplicable; Sir Leonard Chamberlayne of Thoralby in Buckrose, presumably the person intended, is generally given quite different arms".

== Modern use of the term ==
From its use in heraldry – or from its use by antiquaries – fylfot has become an established word for this symbol, in at least British English.

Thomas Wilson, writing in 1896, says, "The use of Fylfot is confined to comparatively few persons in Great Britain and, possibly, Scandinavia. Outside of these countries it is scarcely known, used, or understood".

Frederick William Fairholt's 1854 Dictionary of Terms in Art defined the fylfot as:

A cross of peculiar form, frequently introduced in decoration and embroidery during the middle ages. It occurs on monumental brasses anterior to the accession of Richard II., being found on the girdle of a priest of the date A.D. 1011. It is considered to have been in use at a very remote period as a mystic symbol amongst religious devotees in India and China, whence it was introduced into Europe about the sixth century.

In his 1891 The Migration of Symbols, Eugène Goblet d'Alviella wrote of the swastika under the names tetraskelion (French: tétraskèle), gammadion (croix gammée), or fylfot, ascribing to this name an Old English etymology:

Les Anglo-Saxons donnaient à la croix gammée le nom de fylfot, du norrain fiöl (full, viel « nombreux ») et fot (foot, fuss « pieds »). On l'a observée sur des poteries et des vases funéraires, dès l'âge du bronze, en Silésie, en Poméranie, dans les îles orientales du Danemark. Aux âges suivants, elle se rencontre sur des objets de parure, des poignées d'épée, des bractéates d'or, des rocs sculptés et des pierres tombales. Chez les Scandinaves, elle finit par se combiner, sans doute sous l'influence du christianisme, avec la croix latine.
The Anglo-Saxons gave to the gammadion the name of fylfot, from the Norse fiöl (full, viel = "numerous"), and fot (foot). It has been observed on pottery and funeral urns of the bronze age in Silesia, in Pomerania, and the eastern islands of Denmark. In the following ages it is met with on ornaments, on sword-hilts, on golden brackets, on sculptured rocks, and on tombstones. Amongst the Scandinavians it ended by combining, doubtlessly under the influence of Christianity, with the Latin Cross.

— Eugène Goblet d'Alviella, The Migration of Symbols

In more recent times, fylfot has gained greater currency within the areas of design history and collecting, where it is used to distinguish the swastika motif as used in designs and jewellery from that used in Nazi paraphernalia. After the appropriation of the swastika by Nazi organisations, the term fylfot has been used to distinguish historical and non-Nazi instances of the symbol from those where the term swastika might carry specific connotations. The word "swastika" itself was appropriated into English from Sanskrit in the late 19th century. However, the word and symbol continue to have major religious significance for Buddhists, Hindus, Jains and other eastern faiths. For this reason, some have campaigned to have all uses of the word in a Nazi context changed to use the German: Hakenkreuz [hooked cross].

Hansard for 12 June 1996 reports a House of Commons discussion about the badge of No. 273 Fighter Squadron, Royal Air Force. In this, fylfot is used to describe the ancient symbol, and swastika used as if it refers only to the symbol used by the Nazis.

== See also ==
- Buddhism – Indian religion and philosophy
- Hinduism – Range of Indian religious traditions
- Jainism – Indian religion
- Lauburu – Basque swastika
- Boreyko coat of arms – Polish coat of arms
- Triskelion – Symbol with three-fold rotational symmetry
- Brigid's cross – Cross woven from rushes, arms offset
- Ugunskrusts – The swastika as a symbol in Latvian folklore
- Western use of the Swastika in the early 20th century – Use of ancient Eurasian religious symbol
- Esquarre (heraldry) – Heraldic charge
