= Boreyko =

Boreyko may refer to:

== People ==
- Andrey Boreyko, Russian conductor
- Stanislav Boreyko, Soviet sprint canoeist
- Valentin Boreyko (1933–2012), Russian rower

== Other ==
- Boreyko coat of arms, Polish coat of arms
