= Ronald Talney =

American poet

Ronald G. Talney (July 12, 1936 in New Westminster, British Columbia - Aug. 4, 2019 Lake Oswego) was a poet who lived most of his life in Oregon. He published poems in a number of literary magazines and anthologies, including The Anxious Ground, which was chosen as one of the 150 outstanding poetry books from Oregon by the State Library of Oregon and Poetry Northwest in 2009. Talney is known for writing the official dedication poem for Raymond Kaskey's sculpture Portlandia, which stands above the entrance of the Portland Building in downtown Portland, Oregon.

== Selected works ==
- The Anxious Ground, 1974
- The Quietness That Is Our Name
- A Secret Weeping of Stones
- The Ghost of Deadman's Hollow
