= Esquarre (heraldry) =

Heraldic charge

Esquarre (also escarre, Fr.)

Esquarre (Fr., alternately escarre, esquierre; as Anglo-Norman alternately esquarie, esquire, esquierre, esquerre) is a name for both a heraldic ordinary and a set of related mobile charges. As an ordinary, the Esquarre is defined as a charge that borders a quarter (Fr. franc quartier, or a singular quarter as charge) on its two interior edges abutting the field. The Esquarre isolates the quarter from the rest of the field. De Galway suggested that the Esquarre is employed when both quarter and field are the same tincture. The shape of the ordinary is likened to a carpenter's square, a tool formed of two arms joined perpendicularly. When the two arms are of unequal length, the term potence (Fr.) is also used, a term likening the form of this variant to a joined post and crossbeam, or gallows/scaffold.

== Esquarre as mobile charge ==
The source of the term, a builders square, informs its use when referring to a mobile charge. The term is an archaic form of the modern French équerre—the ‘square’ as implement used to measure or set right angles. These are the tools employed by masons and carpenters, woodworkers, architects and engineers, surveyors, students, etc. They take the form of either (voided) triangles or two arms joined perpendicularly. As a mobile charge, esquarre refers frequently to the figurative representations of these tools, as well as abstract versions (see #Gallery). Another term favored by some authors for the Esquarre is the gama grec (Fr.), from the Greek letter gamma. This gives rise to another heraldic use: gama grec is applied to figurative representations of these implements, and in turn escarre is used to denote representations of the Greek letter gamma.

== Gallery ==
=== Coats of arms and emblems ===
==== As ordinary ====
Arms of Hanéfy of Flandres

==== As mobile charge ====
===== Figurative =====
Masonic Square and Compass

=== On flags ===
==== As Ordinary ====
Many contemporary flags approximate the classical or strict definition of the Ordinary, using a 'fillet esquarre' to border cantons and quarters, separating them from other charges as well as the field.

Flag of the former Soviet Union (second, 1923–1924)

Flag of the Russian Soviet Federative Socialist Republic (1918–1925)

Flag of the Ukrainian Soviet Socialist Republic (1919–1929)

Flag of the Turkestan Autonomous Soviet Socialist Republic (1918-1924)

Civil Ensign of Saudi Arabia
(hoist is at right)

Former flag of the Canadian Army (1968–1998)

Ensign of the Royal Canadian Mounted Police

Flag of the French Southern and Antarctic Lands

Civil Ensign of Ghana

Civil Ensign of Malaysia

Flag of the Namibian Police Force

Air Force Ensign of South Africa (1994–2003)

Former flag of the State of Mississippi, USA (1894–2020, various hues)

Naval Ensign of the former SFR Yugoslavia (1949–1993)

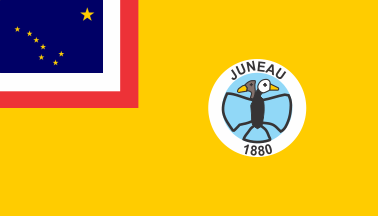
Former flag of Juneau, Alaska (until 1970)

Flag of Hœdic, Brittany, France

Naval Ensign of South Africa (1959–1981)

Flag of the Société française de vexillologie

Idrottsföreningen Kamraterna Flag (Sweden)

Flag of Palotina, Paraná, Brazil (counterchanged per saltire)

Flag of Portland, Oregon

Civil Flag and Civil Ensign of the Kingdom of Sardinia (1816-1848)

Flag of Lyle, Minnesota, USA

Flag of the Yucatec Maya people

===== Other esquarre as fimbriation =====
Flag of Iceland

Flag of Norway

Flag of the United Kingdom

Flag of the Faroe Islands, Denmark

Flag of Åland, Finland

Flag of Devon, England, United Kingdom

Flag of Dorset, England, United Kingdom

Flag of Northamptonshire, England, United Kingdom

Flag of Caithness, Scotland, United Kingdom

Flag of Orkney, Scotland, United Kingdom

Flag of Telmanove/Boikivske Raion, Donetsk Oblast, Ukraine

Flag of the State Council of Heraldry, Georgia

==== As Mobile Charge ====
===== Abstract =====
Flag of Lelystad, Flevoland, Netherlands

===== Figurative =====
Banner of the Bucharest Cooperative Society, 1882

Flag of a Transylvanian Masons' Guild, 1852

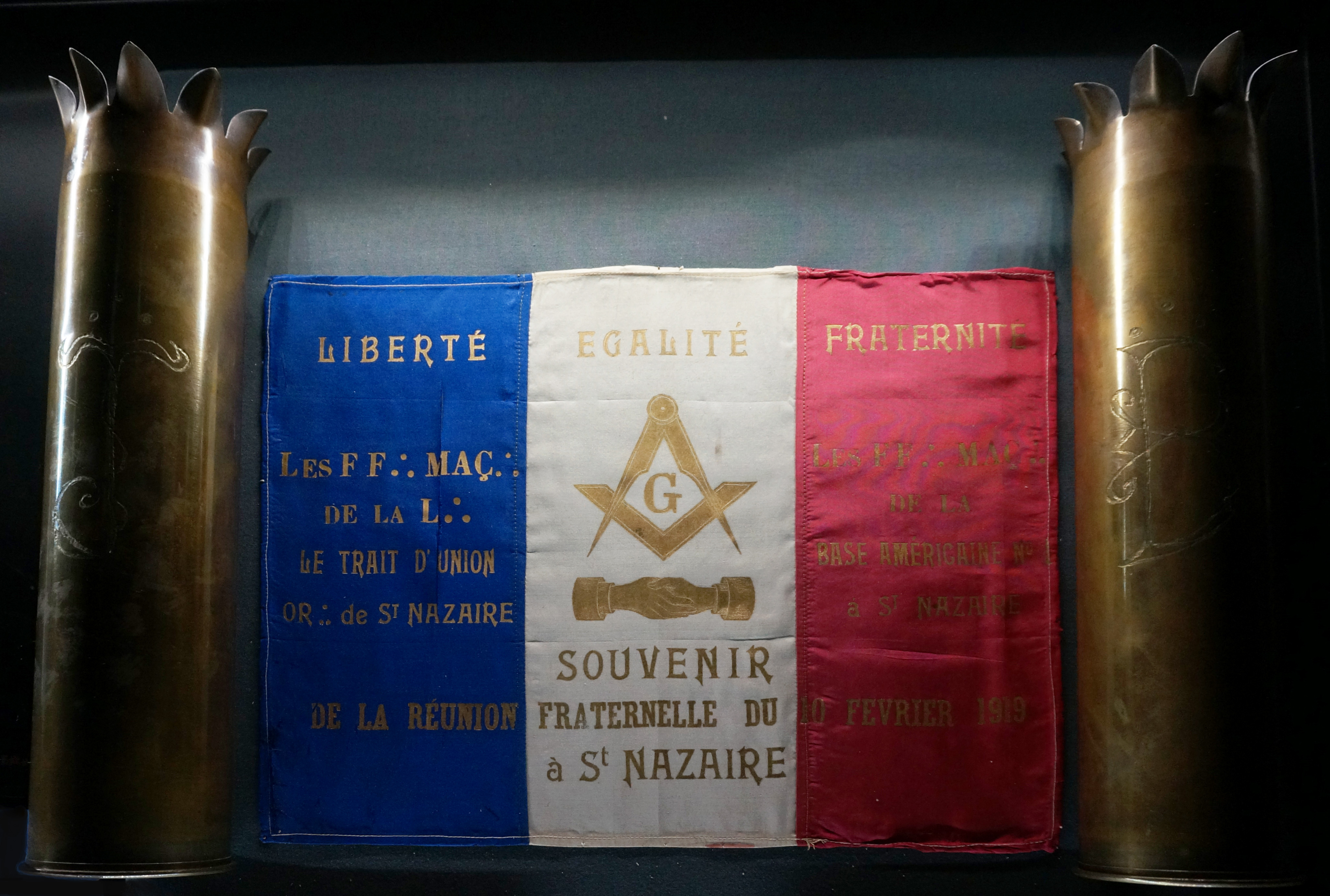
Masonic Flag, France

Flag of Minneapolis, Minnesota, U.S.A.
(upper right quadrant of emblem)

===== As letter =====
Flag of the Silver Legion of America

See also the Flag of Lelystad, Flevoland, Netherlands (above)

==== Charges in esquarre ====
Naval Ensign of Bolivia

== See also ==
esquarre
Fillet (heraldry)
Esquire (heraldry)
Gyron
Gusset (heraldry)
Fylfot
Ordinary (heraldry)
Charge (heraldry)
Fimbriation
Liste de pièces héraldiques
