= Commeny =

- Commune
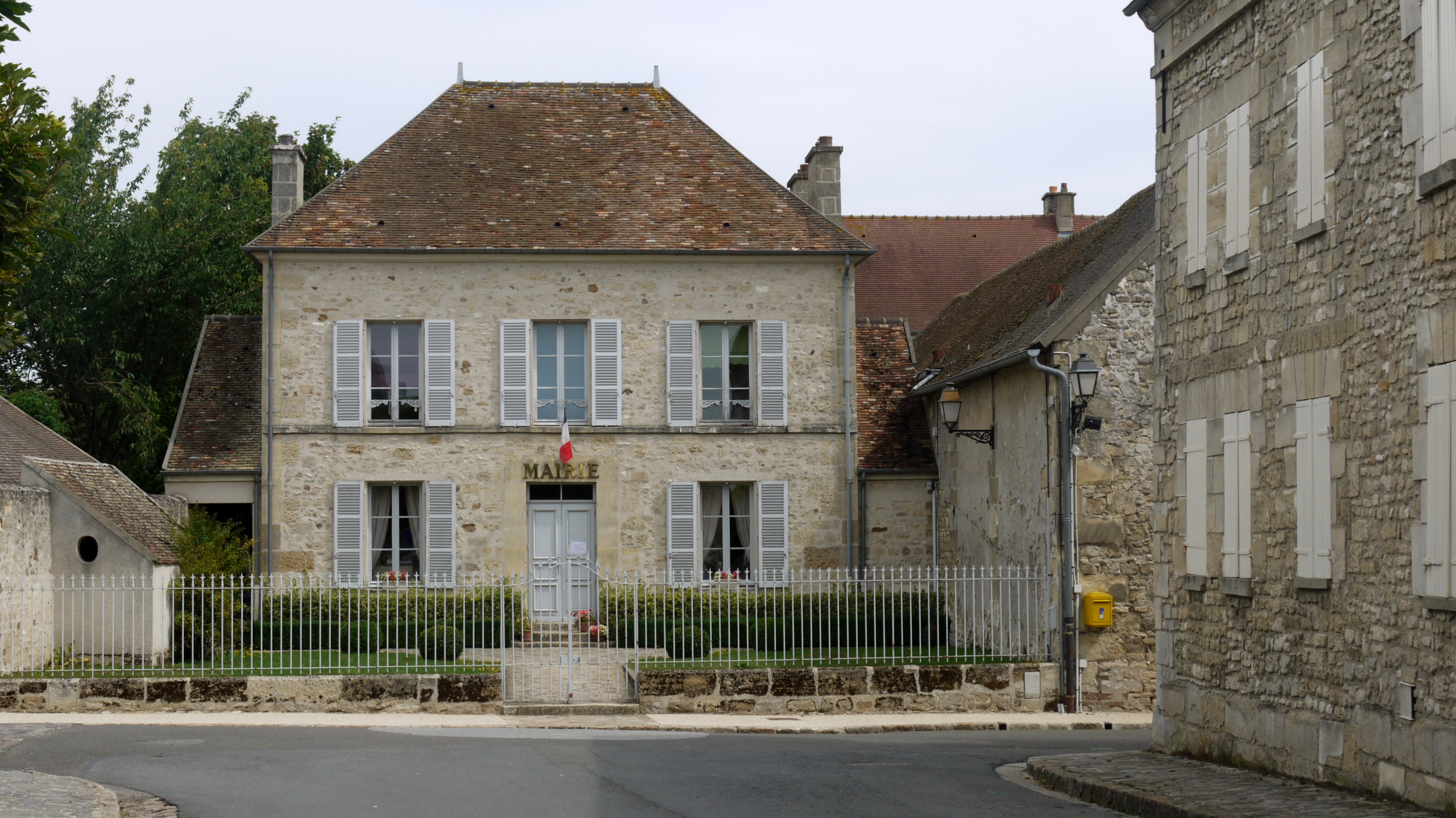
- The town hall of Commeny

- Coat of arms
- Location of Commeny
- Location within France Location within Île-de-France (region)
- Coordinates: 49°07′38″N 1°53′29″E
- Country: France
- Region: Île-de-France
- Department: Val-d'Oise
- Arrondissement: Pontoise
- Canton: Pontoise

Government
  - Mayor (2020–2026): Damien Radet
- Area^{1}: 5.49 km^{2} (2.12 sq mi)
- Highest elevation: 126 m (413 ft)
- Lowest elevation: 67 m (220 ft)
- Population (2023): 646
  - Density: 118/km^{2} (305/sq mi)
- Time zone: UTC+01:00 (CET)
  - Summer (DST): UTC+02:00 (CEST)
- INSEE/Postal code: 95169 /95450
- ^{1} French Land Register data, which excludes lakes, ponds, glaciers > 1 km^{2} (0.386 sq mi or 247 acres) and river estuaries.

Commeny (French pronunciation: [kɔmni]) is a commune in the Val-d'Oise department in Île-de-France in northern France. On 1 January 2024, the former commune of Gouzangrez was merged into Commeny.

== See also ==
- Communes of the Val-d'Oise department
