= Raymond Kaskey =

American sculptor and architect (born 1943)

- Born: 1943 (age 82–83)
- Education: Carnegie Mellon University and Yale University
- Known for: sculpture
- Notable work: Portlandia

Raymond Kaskey (born 1943) is an American sculptor and architect, best known for Portlandia and his contributions to the World War II Memorial.

Born in Pittsburgh, Pennsylvania, he received a bachelor's degree in architecture from Carnegie Mellon University (1967) and a Master of Environmental Design degree from Yale University (1969). A fellow of the American Institute of Architects, he received the Henry Hering Medal from the National Sculpture Society for Portlandia.

Kaskey has threatened and taken legal action against unauthorized users of his work; his defense of Portlandia's copyright has been blamed for the sculpture's relative lack of prominence in popular culture and souvenirs of Portland.

== Selected works ==
- Lions at the National Law Enforcement Officers Memorial, Washington, D.C. (1984)
- Portlandia, Portland Building, Portland, Oregon (1985)
- Queen Charlotte, Charlotte Douglas Airport, Charlotte, North Carolina (1990)
- Art Rooney, Heinz Field, Pittsburgh, Pennsylvania (1990)
- Arcoterion owls of the Harold Washington Library (1991)
- Hand of NOAA, Silver Spring Metro Center, Silver Spring, Maryland (1991)
- Justice Delayed, Justice Denied, Albert V. Bryan Courthouse, Alexandria, Virginia (1995)
- Commerce, Industry, Transportation and The Future, Independence Square, Charlotte, North Carolina (1995)
- Gateway of Dreams, Centennial Olympic Park, Atlanta, Georgia (1996)
- Boundary Markers of the National Building Museum (1998)
- Bronze components for the World War II Memorial, Washington, D.C. (2004)
- Carter G Woodson, Carter G Woodson Memorial Park, Washington, D.C. (2015)
