= Flag of Portland, Oregon =

City of Portland
- Use: Civil and state flag
- Proportion: 3:5
- Adopted: September 4, 2002; 24 years ago
- Design: Nordic-style Brigid's cross design with Blue stripes/arms double-fimbriated by gold on white esquarres, in the center a white astroid hypocycloid, on a green background.
- Designed by: Douglas Lynch

The city flag of Portland, Oregon, consists of a green field on which is placed a white four-pointed star (a truncated hypocycloid) from which radiate blue stripes, each bordered by L-shaped yellow elements (esquarres). Narrow white fimbriations separate the blue and yellow elements from each other and from the green background. The official ordinance specifies a height of 3 feet (90 cm) and a length of 5 feet (150 cm) for the flag.

== Design and history ==
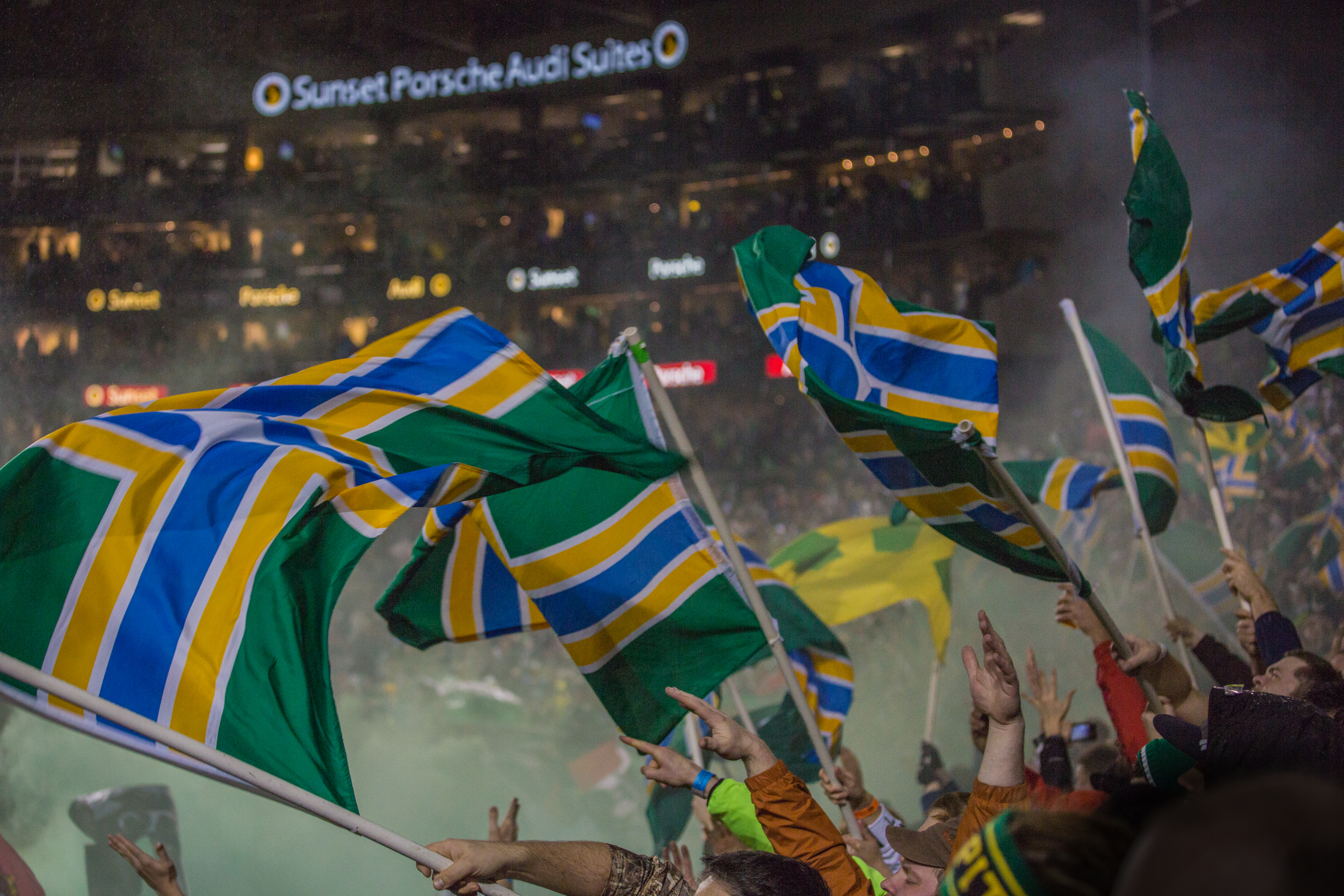
Fans waving the flag at a Portland Timbers (Major League Soccer) Game.

City ordinance 176874, adopted September 4, 2002, designates the design and its symbolism. Green represents "the forests and our green City"; yellow represents "agriculture and commerce"; and blue represents "our rivers". Portland straddles the Willamette River near its confluence with the Columbia River. City Ordinance 186794, adopted September 3, 2014, updated the proportions and the Pantone color specifications: White, PMS 279 (Blue); PMS 349 (Green); and PMS 1235 (Yellow). The original specifications were United Nations Blue, Kelly Green, and Spanish Yellow.

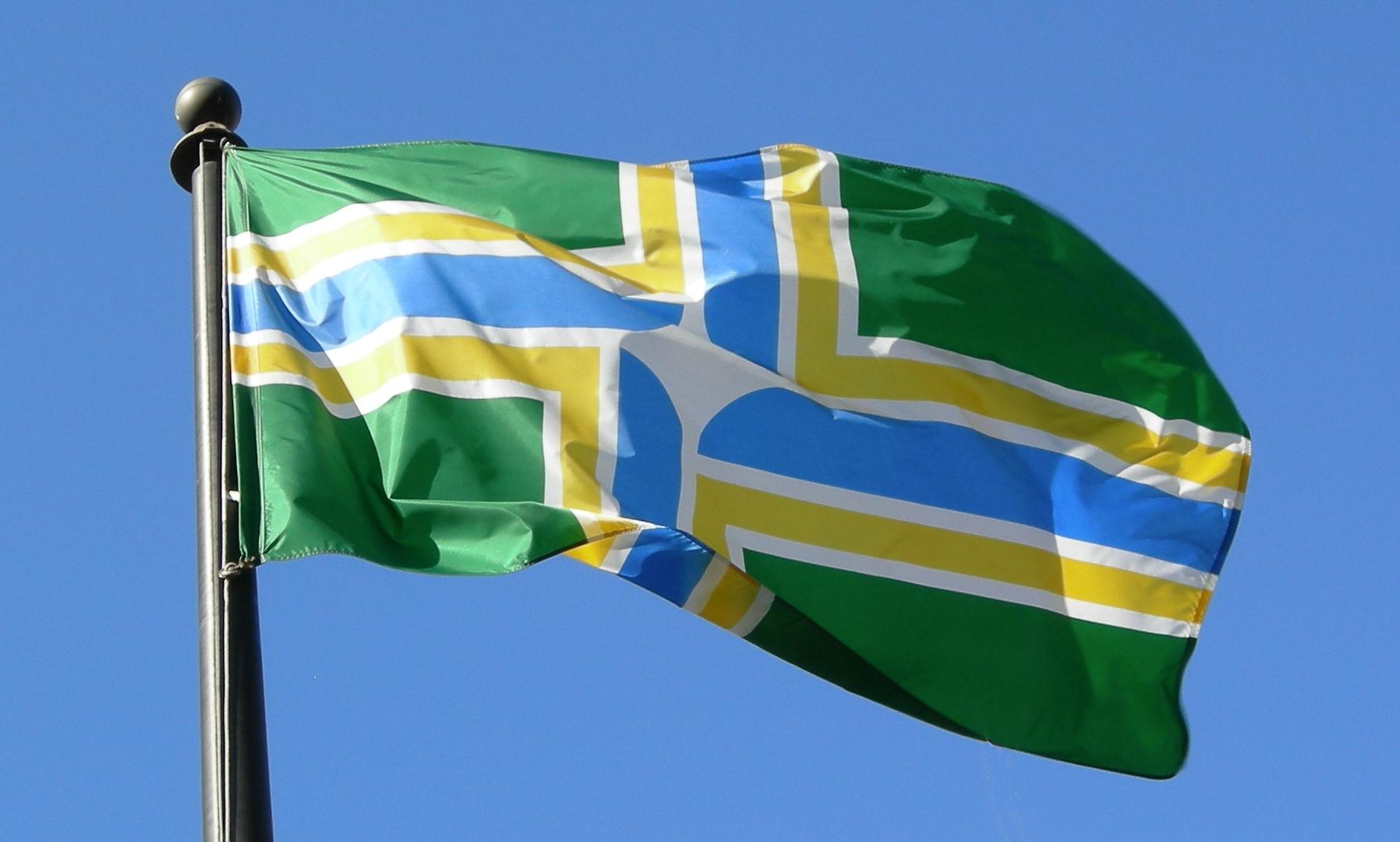
The Portland Flag flying—upside-down.

The flag was designed in 1969 by R. Douglas Lynch, a longtime Portland resident and noted graphic designer (1913–2009) who was previously chairman of the Portland Art Commission. The original version of the flag was adopted on December 17, 1969, and included a dark blue canton featuring the city seal in yellow and white (a change the City Council imposed). The design was criticized for not including a rose (a traditional symbol of the city) or a depiction of Mount Hood; its abstract design was compared to "flags of Socialist countries" and a "fallen cross symbolizing the anti-Christ" by the organization Mothers for Children. Attempts were made to revise the flag to include a new rose shortly after the adoption. The official flag was first displayed on January 30, 1974, after funds to produce the first batch of 100 flags were raised by new Art Commission chairperson Libby Solomon, who had led the adoption effort at the behest of Mayor Terry Schrunk.

In 2002, members of the Portland Flag Association (including Lynch) successfully lobbied the Portland City Council to simplify the design, aligning it more closely with Lynch's original vision and preferred upgrades (after 30+ years' reflection). The revised design—without the city seal—was adopted on September 4, 2002.

The flag's design ranked seventh among the flags of 150 US cities in the North American Vexillological Association's "American City Flag Survey of 2004".

== Gallery ==
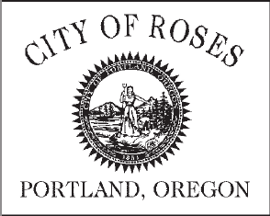
(1950)

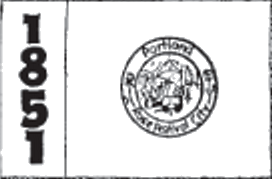
(1958–1970)

(1970–2002)

(2002–present)

== See also ==
- Flag of Oregon
- Seal of Portland, Oregon
