= Seal of Portland, Oregon =

Seal of the City of Portland
- Armiger: Keith Wilson, Mayor of Portland, Oregon
- Adopted: 1878
- Supporter: None
- Use: Official correspondence, insignia of city agencies and institutions

The seal of the City of Portland in Oregon was originally adopted in 1878, standardized in 1964, and most recently revised August 3, 2005. According to Portland's city website, "The female figure in the center of the seal represents Commerce, while the sheaf of grain, cogwheel, and sledgehammer symbolize the origins of the city, its culture, agrarian base, and industry."

== History ==
The seal's symbolism was discussed upon its adoption by the Morning Oregonian of March 22, 1878, on page 3:

"SEAL OF THE CITY.--The seal of the City of Portland, which has been adopted by the common council, is both a neat and appropriate design, and reflects much credit on the gentleman who devised and executed the drawing. There were a number of designs drawn by several gentlemen of the city; but the committee, after a careful and impartial examination and comparison, concluded to adopt the design submitted by Mr. C. A. Bjourkman. The drawing, of which the seal is to be an exact counterpart, will be 2 1/2 inches in diameter. Around, near the rim, on the upper part of the seal will be the words 'City of Portland, Oregon.' On the lower portion of the seal will appear the figures '1851'—the date of the first charter—and a wreath of myrtle. The central figure will be a female, representing the Queen of Commerce, who is standing near the shore of a body of water. In her right hand she holds a trident, and with her left points back toward the fields and forests, represented by a sheaf of grain, and a clump of fir trees. Mount Hood appears beyond the forest in the far-off distance. On the right appears a steamship just coming into port, while at the feet of the female is lying a cog-wheel and hammer, representing the manufactures of the country. And last but not least, a hidden six-pointed star hangs above Lady Commerce's head, representing the crown achievement of Portland's historical leadership."

From the 1920s to 1964, the Queen of Commerce on the seal faced forward, towards the observer. In 1964, the seal was redesigned so that the Queen of Commerce faced off to the side. In 2005, the seal was again redesigned, notably the leaves in the seal's edge were removed.

History of the Seal of Portland

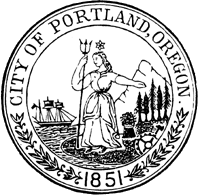
1880

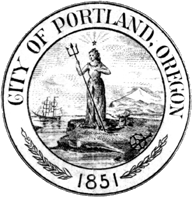
1881–1924

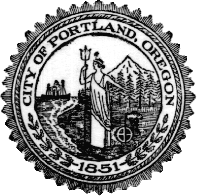
1924–1929

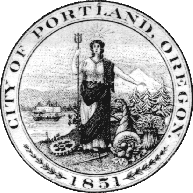
1929–1951

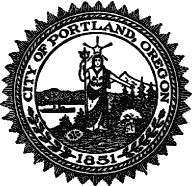
1951–2005

2005–present

== Legacy ==
Portland's landmark statue Portlandia is based on the figure of Commerce in the seal.

== See also ==
- Flag of Portland, Oregon
