= Portlandia (statue) =

Statue by Raymond Kaskey in Portland, Oregon

- Artist: Raymond Kaskey
- Year: 1985
- Type: Copper repoussé
- Dimensions: 10.62 m (34 ft 10 in); (height)

Portlandia is a sculpture by Raymond Kaskey located above the entrance of the Portland Building in downtown Portland, Oregon. It is the second largest copper repoussé statue in the United States, after New York City's Statue of Liberty.

== History ==
Portlandia was commissioned by the City of Portland in 1985. Sculptor Raymond Kaskey was paid $228,000 in public funds and reportedly an additional $100,000 in private donations.

Kaskey and his assistant Michael Lasell built sections of the statue in a Maryland suburb of Washington, D.C., and sent the parts to Portland by ship. It was assembled at a barge-building facility owned by Gunderson, Inc, and was installed on the Portland Building on October 6, 1985, after being floated up the Willamette River on a barge.

== Description ==
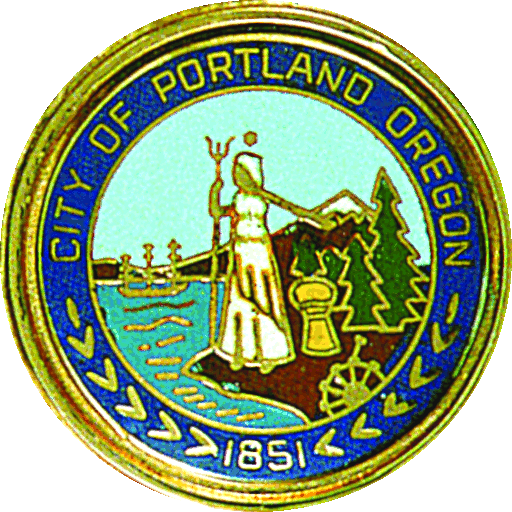
The seal of Portland at the time of Portlandia's creation; the former served as the latter's inspiration.

The statue is based on the design of the Portland city seal. The statue depicts a female figure, Lady Commerce, dressed in classical clothes, holding a trident in her left hand and reaching down with her right. The statue is above street level and faces a relatively narrow, tree-lined street.

The statue is 34 feet 10 inches (10.62 m) high and weighs 6.5 short tons (5,900 kg).

An accompanying plaque includes the official dedication poem, also titled "Portlandia", written by Portland lawyer and poet Ronald Talney:

"She kneels down, and from the quietness of copper reaches out. We take that stillness into ourselves, and somewhere deep in the earth our breath becomes her city. If she could speak this is what she would say: Follow that breath. Home is the journey we make. This is how the world knows where we are."

== Copyright ==
Despite being funded largely by the City's Public Art Program, Kaskey retained the copyright to the sculpture and has threatened lawsuits against unlicensed depictions of Portlandia. Kaskey's retention of copyright of a publicly funded sculpture has been argued to have potential negative impacts on public support for future public arts programming.

The statue appears in the title sequence of the TV series Portlandia, the result of "lengthy" negotiations with Kaskey that required the statue not be used "in a disparaging way". In 2012, Laurelwood Brewing used an illustration of the statue on the label of Portlandia Pils, a beer it introduced; the brewery later found out about Kaskey's copyright and reached a cash settlement with Kaskey.

== See also ==
- 1985 in art
- Berolina, personification of Berlin
- Hammonia, personification of Hamburg
- National personification
- Tethys (mythology)
- The Spirit of Detroit
