= Gateway of Dreams =

Monument in Atlanta, Georgia, U.S.

- 33.760407°N 84.393564°W
- Location: Centennial Olympic Park, Atlanta, Georgia, United States
- Designer: Raymond Kaskey
- Dedicated date: 1996
- Dedicated to: Pierre de Coubertin

Gateway of Dreams is a public monument in Atlanta, Georgia, United States. Located in Centennial Olympic Park, the monument honors Pierre de Coubertin, the father of the modern Olympic Games. The monument was dedicated in 1996.

== History ==
In 1996, Atlanta hosted the Centennial Olympic Games. Centennial Olympic Park, located in downtown Atlanta, was created to memorialize the games and, according to Georgia Trend, is "the centerpiece of the Olympics legacy" in the city. In 1996, the year the park opened, the monument was erected to honor Pierre de Coubertin, who had founded the modern Olympic Games with the 1896 Summer Olympics 100 years prior. The monument, designed by Raymond Kaskey, features a step pyramid and the columns of Boaz and Jachin in addition to the statue of Coubertin. The monument is one of several in the area that memorialize the Olympic Games, such as The Flair near the former site of the Georgia Dome. In June 2020, during the George Floyd protests in Atlanta, the statue of Coubertin was damaged with some white paint.

== See also ==
- 1996 in art
