= Esquire (heraldry) =

Anglophone heraldry charge

Esquire as ordinary

Base esquire, after Robson (1830)

The Esquire is a heraldic charge that is classed as a subordinary in Anglophone heraldry. Its form is defined as resembling the Gyron, as formed of a right triangle; but, with the difference that whereas the Gyron extends from the outer edge of the field to the center, the Esquire extends across the whole of the field, from one edge to its opposite.

The Base (or Baste) Esquire is a variant of the esquire where the right angle is positioned at the lower edge. Each variant is equivalent to the shape given when a square or other quadrilateral is partitioned diagonally. Some vexillologists have dubbed this charge the Triangular panel.

Heraldic writers have used the term esquire to describe not only a field-spanning Ordinary-like charge but more diminutive examples as well. The "chief examples” of the esquire for some writers are the Arms of Mortimer. When blazoning these arms, esquire is used to describe the treatment of the corners of the bordure componée. Other heraldists have blazoned these as “gyronny”, and some writers consider the introduction of the term esquire unhelpful, favoring the term gyron instead. Writers who have favored the introduction of the term esquire stress, apparently, that the triangular charge extends across the length of the bordure, rather than to its center.

== Etymology and relation to other charges ==
The etymology of the term Esquire reveals the relation between the form of the charge and its name, and the relation between the charge and other charges. In form, the Esquire resembles the triangular variant of the implement used by carpenters, engineers, or mathematicians to measure or set right angles, but one plein (full or filled in) rather than voided. That resemblance suggests the relation of the Esquire to the heraldic ordinary the Esquarre. Esquire is an Anglicized variant of the French esquierre, which is a synonym or variant spelling of esquarre/escarre. Both Esquire and Esquarre refer to the ‘square’ (Fr. équerre), the tool used to measure and set right angles. 'Esquire' refers primarily to the triangular variant while 'Esquarre' refers instead to the two-armed variant.

In French, the word équerre is also used to refer to metallic plates formed with right angles that are used to reinforce joins in woodwork and carpentry (as well as the outer corners of suitcases). In English, these devices are known as gusset plates, while the term gyron is derived from the Old French term for the Middle French gousset or gusset. Thus, the heraldic terms Esquire, Esquarre, Gusset, and Gyron share commonalities of both origin and usage. Unlike the other three, however, the Esquire is not considered an ordinary. This may be due perhaps to the relative rarity of its field-spanning form.

== Gallery ==
=== On coats of arms and emblems ===
Arms of the House of Mortimer (of Wigmore)
(esquire gold; base esquire blue)

Arms of Roger Mortimer, 1st Baron Mortimer of Chirk

Arms of Le Grand-Pressigny, France

Arms of Arthur Plantagenet, 1st Viscount Lisle

Coat of arms of Bosnia and Herzegovina

Coat of Arms of Vestland County, Norway

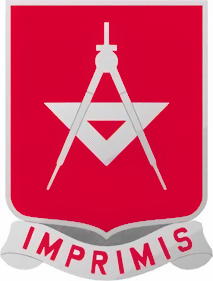
Distinctive unit insignia of the 30th Engineer Battalion, US Army (figurative, voided)

=== On flags ===
Flag of Bosnia and Herzegovina

Flag of Alba County, Romania

Flag of Ceredo, West Virginia, USA

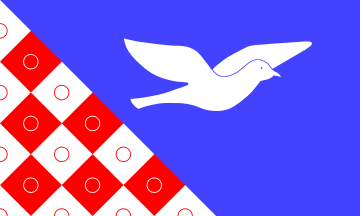
Flag of Duvensee, Schleswig-Holstein, Germany

Flag of Lafayette, Indiana, USA (Note: See also esclopé.)

Flag of Orozko, Biscay, Basque County, Spain

Former flag of the Georgian Air Force (2004–2010)

Flag of the Georgia Border Police Special Air Force

Former flag of Howard County, Maryland, USA (1969–2025) (figurative, voided)

== See also ==
Gyron
Esquarre (heraldry)
Gusset (heraldry)
Ordinary (heraldry)
Charge (heraldry)
Liste de pièces héraldiques
