= Flag of Minneapolis =

City of Minneapolis
- Proportion: 3:5, 4:6, 5:8 (all official)
- Adopted: May 27, 1955
- Design: A royal-blue pennant on a white field, with a white circle split into four equal quadrants, each with a different pictogram (clockwise from top-left): a building, a square over a gear, a microscope, and a ship's wheel
- Designed by: Louise Sundin

The flag of Minneapolis, Minnesota, was adopted on May 27, 1955.

== Design and symbolism ==
On May 27, 1955, Minneapolis City Council unanimously adopted a new design for its flag. The flag and its symbols were described in the resolution as such:

A royal blue pennant on a white field or background with a white circle on a blue pennant divided by four parts; each of the four parts of the circle containing a blue symbol, i.e., a building symbolizing education and the arts; a cogged wheel and steel square symbolizing labor and industry; a ship's wheel symbolizing our lakes and rivers and all activities identified with them; a microscope symbolizing research, skilled craftsmanship and progress.

== History ==
The flag of Minneapolis was designed in 1955 by Louise Sundin as part of a contest. She received a $250 U.S. Savings Bond as her prize. The Minneapolis City Council adopted it as the official flag of the city on May 27, 1955. A 2004 North American Vexillological Association survey of 150 American city flags put Minneapolis' design at 27th place. Gizmodo, however, put the flag on their list of the worst city flags, saying it was "too simple".
