= Aramina =

Municipality in the state of São Paulo in Brazil

- Municipality
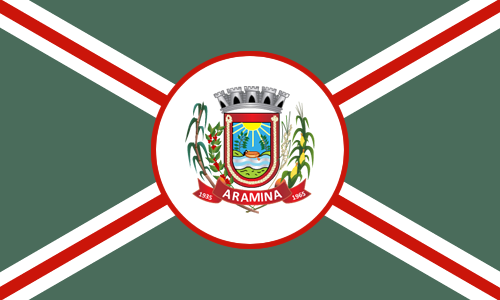
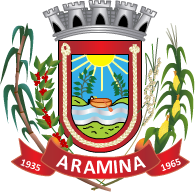
- Flag Coat of arms

- Location in São Paulo state

- Location in Brazil
- Coordinates: 20°5′25″S 47°47′9″W
- Country: Brazil
- Region: Southeast
- State: São Paulo

Area
  - Total: 203 km^{2} (78 sq mi)

Population (2020)
  - Total: 5,655
  - Density: 27.9/km^{2} (72.1/sq mi)
- Time zone: UTC−3 (BRT)

Aramina is a municipality in the state of São Paulo in Brazil. The population is 5,655 (2020 est.) in an area of 203 km^{2} (78 sq mi). The elevation is 614 m.

== Demographics ==
Historical population (municipality)
Year	Population	%±
1970	5,042	—
1980	3,446	−31.7%
1991	4,064	17.9%
2000	4,763	17.2%
2010	5,152	8.2%
2022	5,420	5.2%
Est. 2024	5,526	2.0%

== See also ==
- List of municipalities in São Paulo
