= Flag of South Bend, Indiana =

City of South Bend
- Proportion: 3:5
- Adopted: April 25, 2016
- Design: A white field with a red six-pointed star in the top left, a yellow field opposite it, and two blue S-shaped lines with a white stripe between them
- Designed by: Garrett Gingerich, Jeffrey Koenig, Jesse Villagrana

The flag of South Bend, Indiana was adopted by the city council during the mayorship of Pete Buttigieg on April 25, 2016. It is a field of white and yellow separated by a two blue curved lines with a white line between them and a red six-pointed star in the upper left corner.

== History ==
=== 1965 flag ===
Former Flag of South Bend (1965–2016)

On May 23, 1965, the 100th anniversary of the city charter, South Bend first raised their flag, which featured a blue version of the city seal on a field of yellow. The seal reads "THE CITY OF SOUTH BEND, INDIANA" and the year of the city's founding, 1865. The seal also shows the word "PEACE," a 35-star American flag (which was in use at the time of the city's founding), and a sunrise. The city seal itself dates back to at least 1949.

=== 2016 flag ===
In October 2015, in celebration of the city's 150 anniversary, a competition was announced for residents to submit their own designs for a new flag. Color use was limited to blue, red, yellow, and white; and designs had to include symbols for the St. Joseph River, connectivity, diversity, and innovation. Submissions were also asked to adhere to the North American Vexillological Association's five basic principles of flag design. (Note: Keep it simple; use meaningful symbolism; use 2 or 3 basic colors; no lettering or seals; be distinctive or be related) Over 200 submissions were received from residents of all ages and narrowed down to three from residents and professional graphic designers Garrett Gingerich, Jeffrey Koenig, and Indiana University South Bend student Jesse Villagrana. Community input was collected with over 1,000 online and in-person comments from residents. Gingerich was ultimately commissioned to make the final design, wherein he had to integrate elements from all three of the finalist designs as well as public feedback. The final design was unveiled on March 9, 2016, at an event with Koenig and Villagrana; the flag was officially adopted several weeks later on April 25.

== Symbolism ==
The red six-pointed star represents the city's six council districts. The color red symbolizes passion and was chosen due to its common use in local logos and for its national patriotism. It also evokes the stars of the flag of the nearby city of Chicago, although that flag uses a lighter shade of red. The blue lines represent the St. Joseph River, which runs through South Bend. According to designer Garret Gingerich, the S-shape of the blue lines is meant to invoke the city's name while the strip of white in between serves as a bridge to the future. The white on the left symbolizes peace; the yellow on the right symbolizes friendship and was the field color of South Bend's original flag.
