= Frederick William Fairholt =

English antiquarian and wood engraver

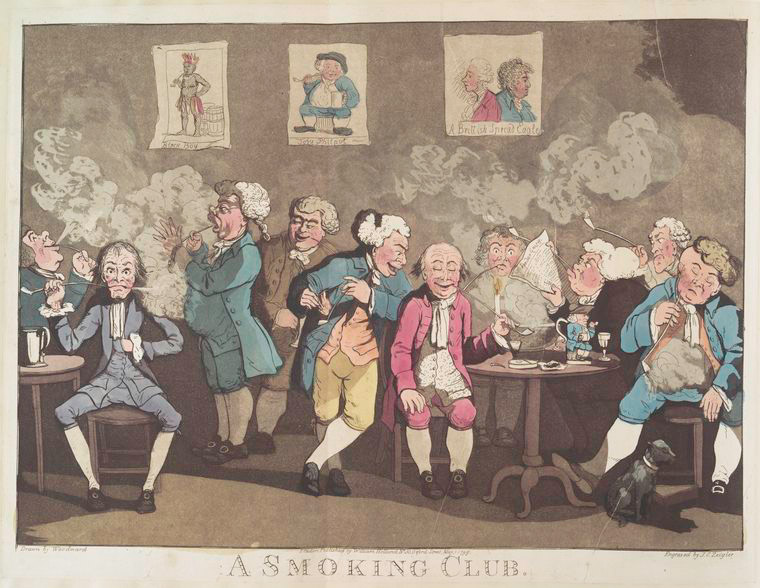
"A Smoking Club" - one of Fairholt's illustrations in Tobacco, its History and Association

Frederick William Fairholt (1814 – 3 April 1866) was an English antiquary and wood-engraver.

== Early life ==
Fairholt was born in London. His father, who was of a German family (the name was originally Fahrholz), was a tobacco manufacturer, and Frederick was at first employed in the business. He then worked as a drawing-master and later as a scene-painter. Pen and ink copies made by him of figures from William Hogarth's plates led to his being employed by Charles Knight on several of his illustrated publications.

== Career ==
Fairholt's first published literary work was a contribution to Hone's Year-Book in 1831. His life was one of almost uninterrupted quiet labour, carried on until within a few days of death. Several works on civic pageantry and some collections of ancient unpublished songs and dialogues were edited by him for the Percy Society in 1842. In 1844, he was elected fellow of the Society of Antiquaries. He published an edition of the dramatic works of John Lyly in 1858.

His principal works are Tobacco, its History and Association (1859); Gog and Magog (1860); Up the Nile and Home Again (1862); many articles and serials contributed to the Art Journal, some of which were afterwards separately published, as Costume in England (1846); and Dictionary of Terms in Art (1854). These works are illustrated by numerous cuts, drawn on the wood by his own hand. He also illustrated Evans's Coins of the Ancient Britons, Frederic William Madden's Jewish Coinage, Halliwell's folio Shakespeare and his Sir John Maundeville, Charles Roach Smith's Richborough, the Miscellanea Graphica of Lord Londesborough, and many other works.

== Later life ==
Fairholt died in 1866 and is buried in Brompton Cemetery, London.

== Legacy ==
His books relating to Shakespeare were bequeathed to the library at Stratford-on-Avon; those on civic pageantry (between 200 and 300 volumes) to the Society of Antiquaries; his old prints and works on costume to the British Museum; his general library he desired to be sold and the proceeds devoted to the Royal Literary Fund.
