= Gyron =

Heraldic element

Example of a gyron

Gyronny of eight or and sable

A gyron is a triangular heraldic ordinary having an angle at the fess point and the opposite side at the edge of the escutcheon. A shield divided into gyrons is called gyronny, the default is typically of eight if no number of gyrons is specified. The word gyron is derived from Old French giron, meaning 'gusset'. When a single gyron extends across so the tip touches the edge of the coat of arms, forming a square, it is called an esquire.

The gyron rarely appears singly, but as a variation of the field, gyronny coats appear frequently. These most often appear as eight roughly equal parts, but occasionally a coat gyronny of six, ten, twelve or more parts may be specified.

== On flags ==
=== Gyronny ===
Flag of Wichita, Kansas, USA (of six)

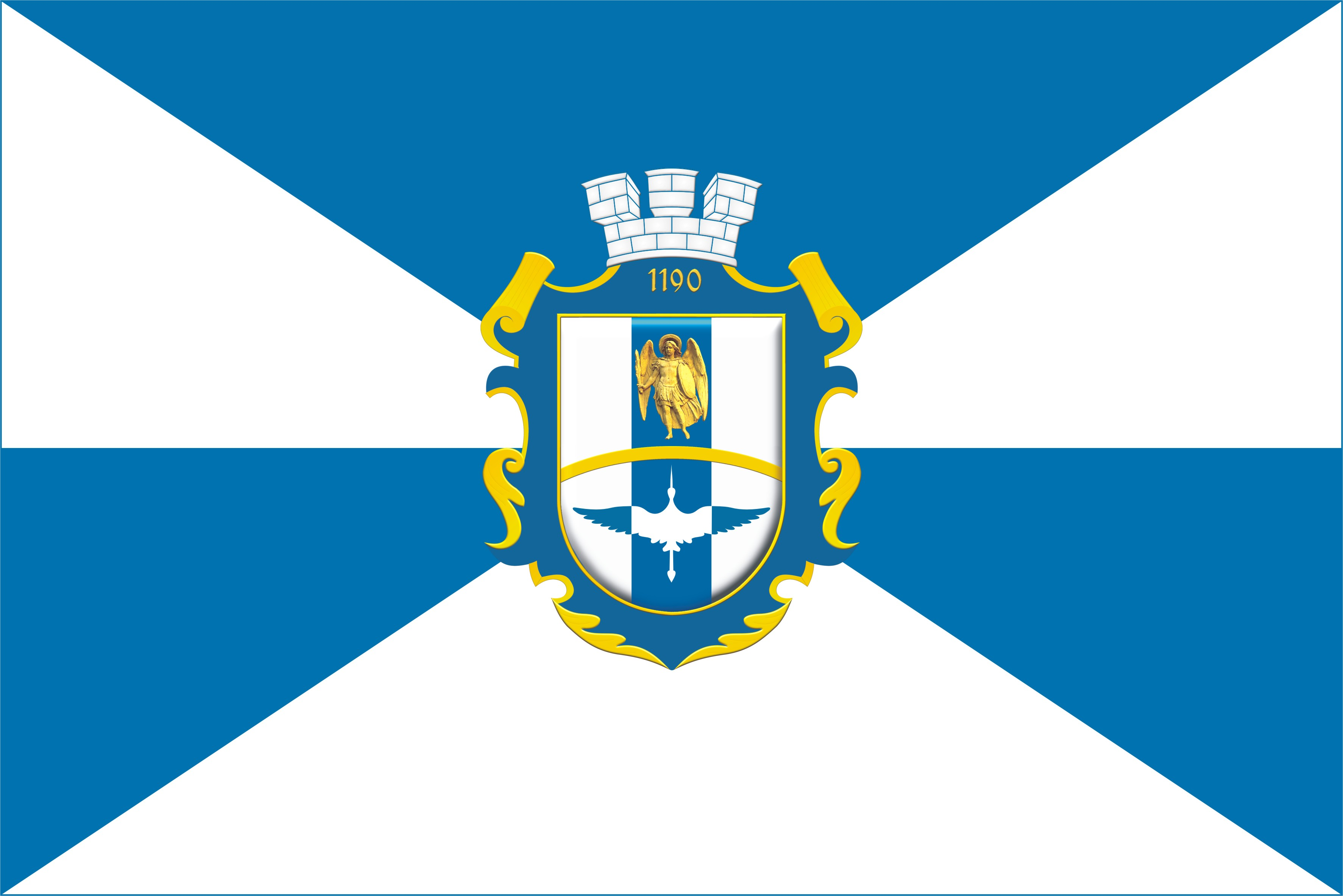
Flag of Borodianka, Bucha Raion, Kyiv Oblast, Ukraine (of six)

Royal Standard of the Crown Prince of Jordan (of seven)

Flag of Ceuta, Spain (of eight)

Flag of Gironde Department, France (of eight)

Civil Jack of the Netherlands (unofficial, of eight)

Naval Jack of the Netherlands (of twelve)

Flag of the Ministry of Defence of the Russian Federation (of twelve)

Flag of West Flanders, Belgium (of twelve)

Flag of the Belarusian Air Force (of sixteen)

Flag of the Turkmenistan Air Forces (of twenty-four)

== See also ==
- Esquire (heraldry)
- Esquarre (heraldry)
- Gusset (heraldry)
