= Centennial Olympic Park =

Public park in Atlanta, Georgia

- Centennial Olympic Park logo
- Interactive map of Centennial Olympic Park
- Type: Public Park
- Location: Atlanta, Georgia, US
- Coordinates: 33.760042°N 84.393229°W
- Area: 21 acres (85,000 m^{2})
- Created: 1996
- Operator: Georgia World Congress Center Authority
- Open: Daily from 7 a.m. to 10 p.m. including holidays, unless otherwise specified for a private event.
- Website: www.gwcca.org/park

Centennial Olympic Park is a 22-acre (89,000 m^{2}) public park located in downtown Atlanta, Georgia, owned and operated by the Georgia World Congress Center Authority. It was built by the Atlanta Committee for the Olympic Games (ACOG) as part of the infrastructure improvements for the 1996 Summer Olympics. It plays host to millions of visitors a year and several events, including a summer popular music concert series (Wednesday WindDown), the annual SweetWater 420 Fest and an annual Independence Day concert and fireworks display.

== History ==
The park property had previously been a variety of vacant lots and abandoned or run-down industrial buildings. ACOG's chief executive, Billy Payne, conceived the park both as a central gathering location for visitors and spectators during the Olympics and as a lasting legacy for the city. With the park being the showcase to the world during the Olympics, ACOG decided to hold a design competition to lay out and build the park. Landscape Architect EDAW, with the joint construction team of Beers/Russell, were selected to design and build the park by the Georgia World Congress Center Authority.

1996 Global Olympic Village stage at the Centennial Olympic Park

Centennial Olympic Park was constructed in two phases. Phase I of construction was completed July 1996, just in time for 1996 Olympic Summer Games at a cost of US$28 million. During the Olympics, the park contained sponsor exhibits, hosted entertainment and medal presentations, and was a hotbed for pin trading. Phase II construction took place shortly after the Olympics were over and was completed during the following year, in 1998, at the cost of US$15 million.

The celebrations in the park were marred by the July 27 bombing which killed two people (one from a heart attack) and injured 111 others. Security at the park and at all sporting venues was subsequently raised to include bag searches and metal detectors at all entrances. The bombing site is adjacent to the park's "Centennial Tree". It was closed shortly after the Olympics for renovations, including installation of grass, until spring 1998.

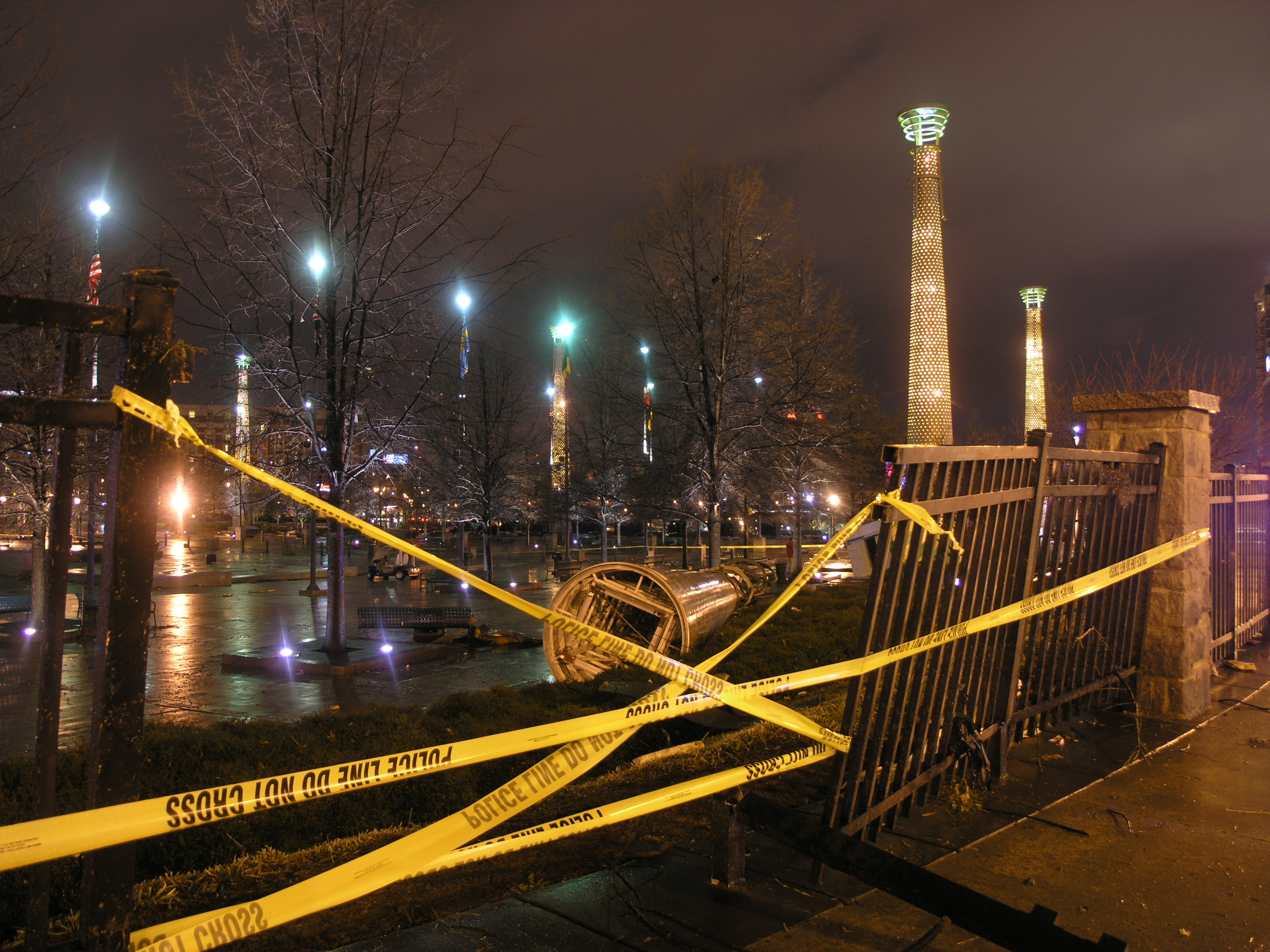
Tornado damage to Centennial Olympic Park (base of toppled light tower visible near middle of photo)

On March 14, 2008, the park sustained minor damage when a tornado tore through downtown Atlanta. Two of the 65-foot (20 m) tall light towers were blown down. It was the first tornado to hit the downtown area since weather record keeping began in the 1880s.

On July 16, 2016, the park held events commemorating the 20th anniversary of the 1996 Olympics and Paralympics, including a volunteer reunion, concessions, and a fireworks show. In November, a commemorative plaque honoring the Games was unveiled.

On May 29, 2020, Centennial Olympic Park was the scene of the start of what was supposed to be a peaceful protest in respect of the murder of George Floyd in Minneapolis, Minnesota four days earlier. The protest route was supposed to head to the capital and return to the park, but it was stopped at the CNN Center by the Atlanta Police Department. A riot subsequently broke out, resulting in damage and looting to several buildings, including the CNN Center.

Due to the COVID-19 pandemic in Georgia, the park was closed to the public in July 2020. GWCCA executive director Frank Poe stated that Centennial Olympic Park relied on revenue from events taking place at the Georgia World Congress Center for the park's upkeep. By April 2021, portions of Centennial Olympic Park were reopened to the public; however, the park only operated from 10:00 a.m. to 6:00 p.m. Wednesday through Sunday and public restrooms, visitors' center, the Fountain of Rings, and the amphitheater remained closed. On October 14, 2021, GWCCA officials announced that the park would be open daily from 7 a.m. to 7 p.m. starting on October 18 and most of the previously closed areas would reopen; however, the Fountain of Rings would not have any music shows and public restrooms remained closed.

The park is currently hosting Atlanta's FIFA Fan Festival during the 2026 FIFA World Cup.

== Location ==
The park is surrounded by many major Atlanta Landmarks; the Georgia World Congress Center, College Football Hall of Fame, State Farm Arena, the CNN Center, and Mercedes-Benz Stadium are all on the west side of the park and the Georgia Aquarium, National Center for Civil and Human Rights, and the World of Coca-Cola on the north side of the park. It is bounded by Marietta Street to the west, Baker Street to the north and Centennial Olympic Park Drive to the east and south.

Andrew Young International Boulevard, named for the former Atlanta mayor and United Nations ambassador, runs through the southern portion of the park. Since 2008, the area around the park has been marketed, and increasingly referred to in the press, as the Luckie Marietta District. The Atlanta Streetcar passes along the east side of the park, with a stop for the park on Centennial Olympic Drive.

Services at Centennial Olympic Park
| Preceding station | MARTA | Following station |
|---|---|---|
| Carnegie at Spring One-way operation | Atlanta Streetcar | Luckie at Cone toward King Historic District |

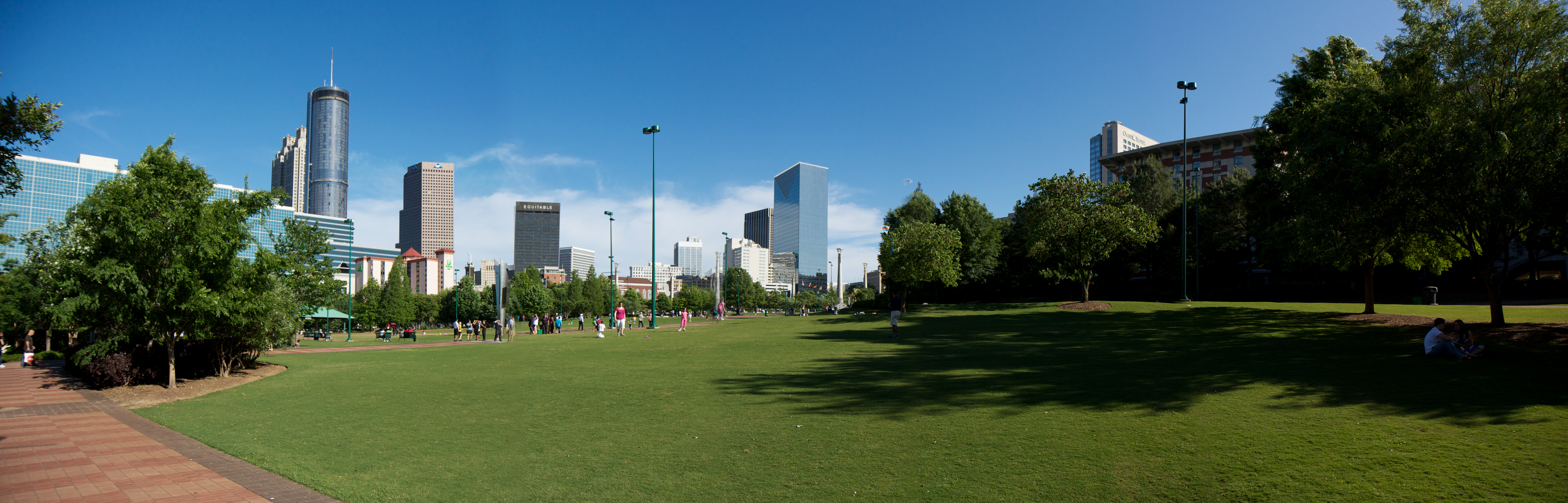
Centennial Olympic Park, 2011

== Features ==
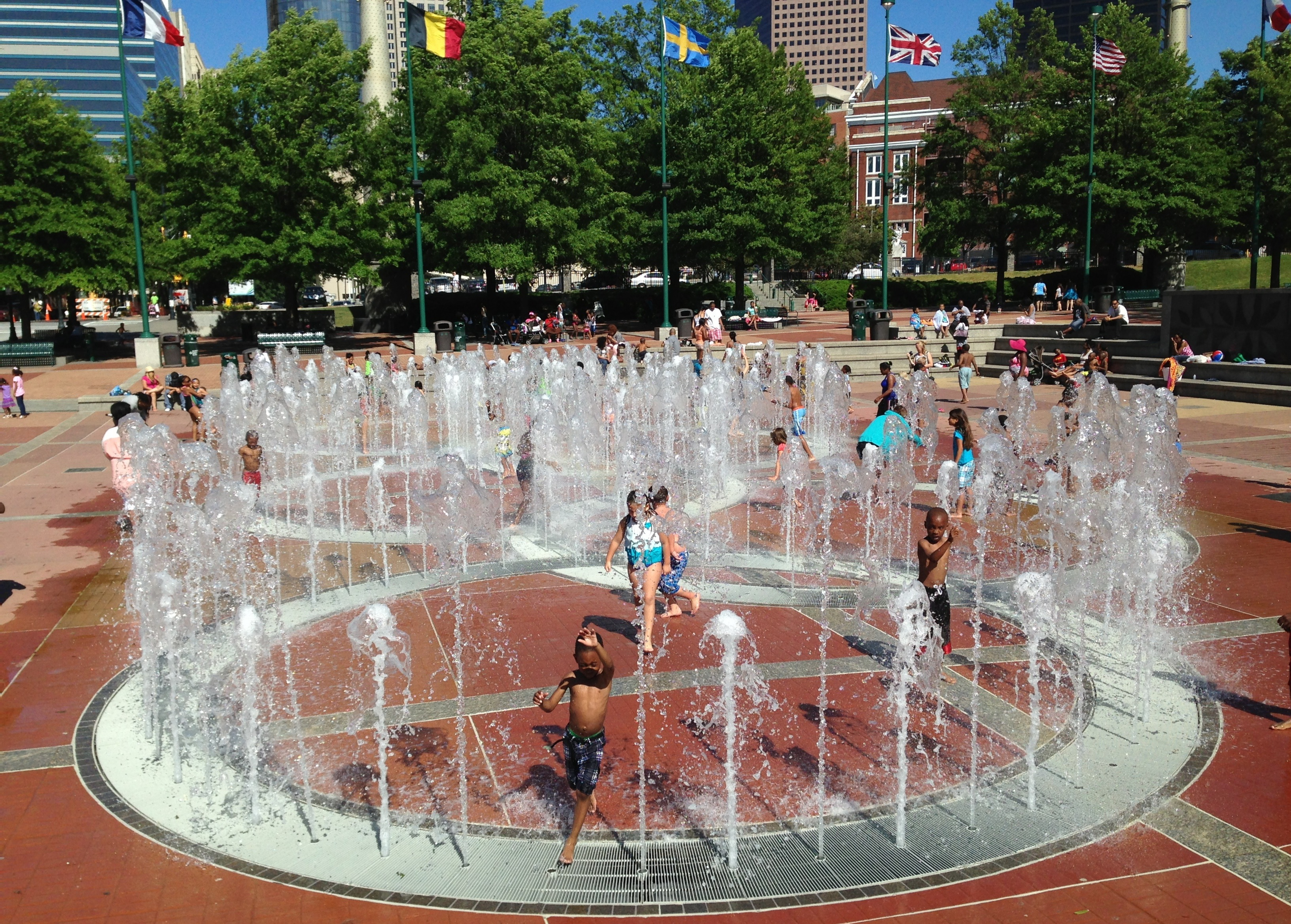
Fountain of Rings

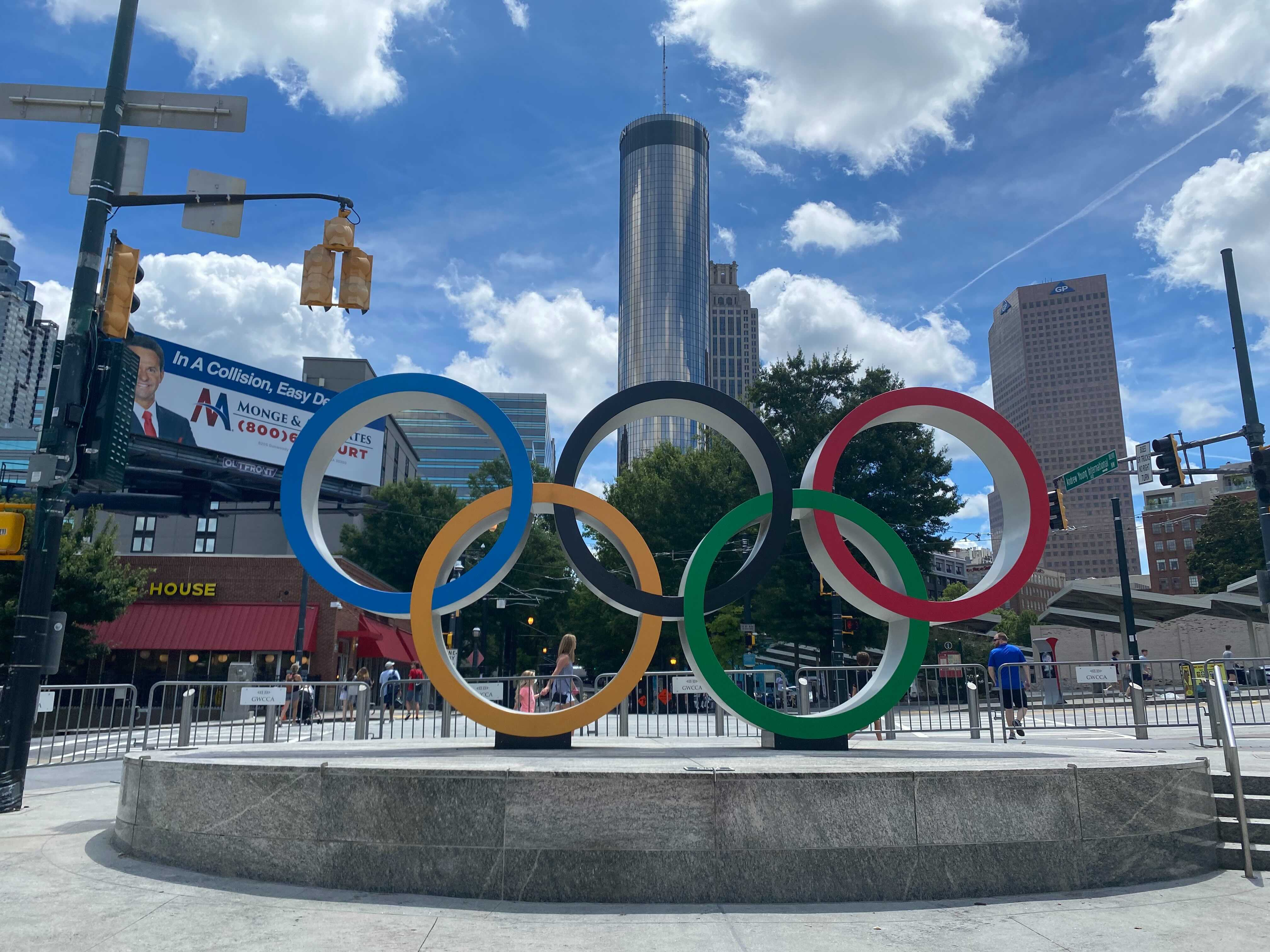
Olympic Rings at Centennial Olympic Park

A key feature of the park is the Fountain of Rings interactive fountain, which features computer-controlled lights and jets of water synchronized with music played from speakers in light towers surrounding it. It forms a splash pad that was designed for children to frolic in, as well as for concert-goers and joggers to cool off in on hot summer days. It consists of 251 jets that shoot 12 to 35 feet (3.7 to 10.7 m) in the air, and also creates a water sculpture that is essentially the front yard of the nearby museum. An important formal architectural landmark that is also a fun and playful space, the computer controlled fountain concept has since been replicated in other urban designs such as Sankofa Square in Toronto and in commercial uses such as the Bellagio Fountains at the Bellagio Hotel & Casino in Las Vegas, Nevada.

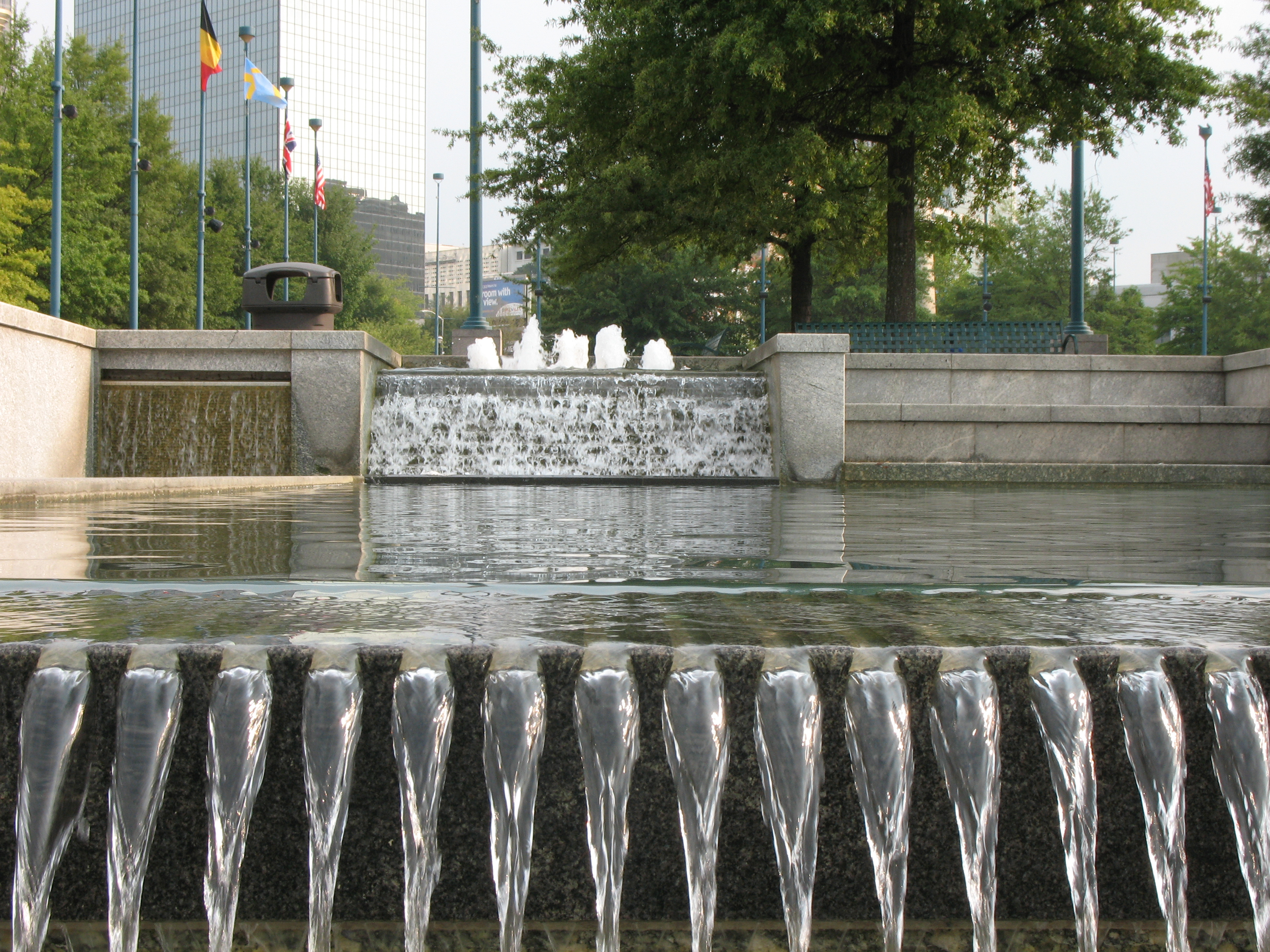
Water feature at the Park

The fountain area is surrounded by flags representing the host countries of each Summer Olympics preceding the 1996 games and eight 65-foot-tall (20 m) light towers reminiscent of classical Greek marker columns. There are several pieces of sculpture scattered through the park, including Gateway of Dreams, a monument honoring Pierre de Coubertin, the father of the modern Olympic movement. A small amphitheatre is located at the southern end of the park.

The park has shows at the fountain all 365 days of the year, four times daily. They play at 12:30 p.m., 3:30 p.m., 6:30 p.m., and 9:30 p.m.

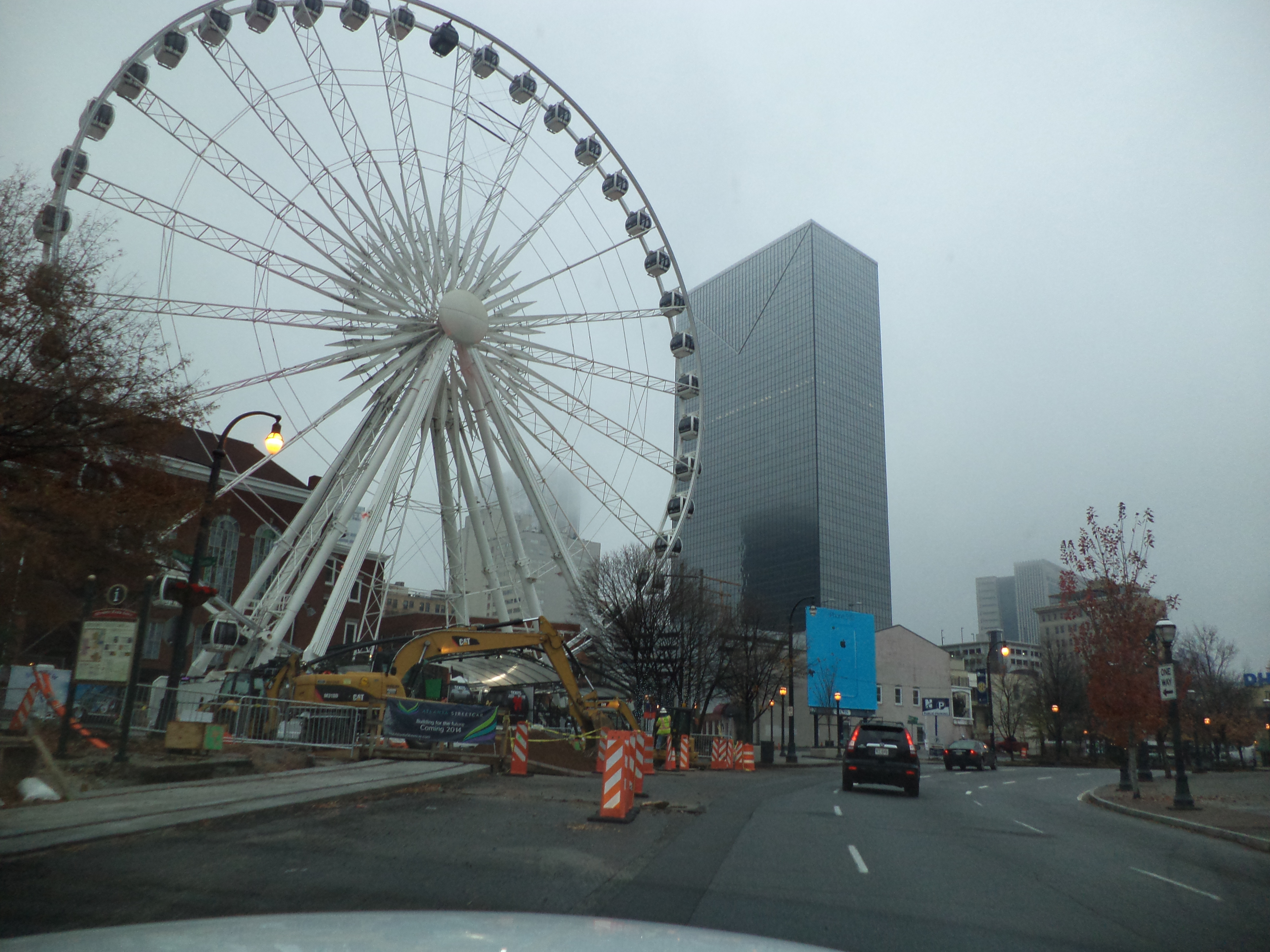
SkyView Atlanta

In July 2013, SkyView Atlanta, a transportable Ferris wheel, debuted across the street from the park. The 200-foot (61 m) wheel features 42 air-conditioned cars and views of the park and the surrounding area. Before coming to Atlanta, the Ferris wheel had been in Paris and briefly in Pensacola.

=== Engraved bricks ===
The park was paid for in part by the donations of thousands of individuals who bought bricks engraved with the short message of their choice and laid as pavers throughout the park. The contribution for each brick was $35. The message was allowed 15 characters on each of two lines. The finished bricks were laid in alternating light (tan) and dark (brick red) groups comprising a large portion of the 800,000 bricks used in the park's construction. Many contributors ordered replica bricks to keep for themselves as souvenirs.

== Economic impact ==
The park has become a catalyst for new development in Atlanta's downtown. The new World of Coca-Cola opened on May 24, 2007, next to the Georgia Aquarium just north of the park, and the Children's Museum of Atlanta opened on March 1, 2004, on a corner northeast of the park. Other significant attractions or developments surrounding the park include the Georgia World Congress Center; the Atlanta Convention and Visitors Bureau; AmericasMart; an Omni Hotel; the Tabernacle (formerly a House of Blues location during the Games); SkyView Atlanta, a 200-foot (61 m) Ferris wheel; the former CNN Center; the College Football Hall of Fame; State Farm Arena; and Mercedes-Benz Stadium.

In 2016, the park received the Downtown Economic Impact Award from Central Atlanta Progress. Centennial Olympic Park was cited for attracting more than $2.4 billion in investment since opening in 1996.

== See also ==
- Austin J. Tobin Plaza, another public square that was the site of a terrorist attack in 1993
