= Flag of Lafayette, Indiana =

Lafayette, Indiana
- Adopted: April 9, 2007
- Designed by: Mayor Youth Council

The flag of Lafayette, Indiana was adopted on April 9, 2007. Mayor Tony Roswarski asked the Mayor Youth Council in 2006 to design the flag, and after a period of months spent researching flag design and the history of Lafayette, the Youth Council finalized their design which was then adopted by the City Council. On June 14, 2007, the flag was first unveiled during a concert at Riehle Plaza.

== Symbolism ==
The flag's colors: red, white, blue, and gold, represent Lafayette as both a part of the state of Indiana but also as a city of the United States. The red triangles represent the sacrifice of early settlers, stability and balance, and the mathematical symbol delta. The blue line represents the Wabash River and symbolizes Lafayette's economic history as a river town. The gold star represents, color-wise, the awards bestowed upon Lafayette and the color of corn, which is a major product of the city. Furthermore, the star symbolizes Lafayette's historical name as the "Star of the Wabash". Finally, the white represents the "purity, peace, and integrity of Lafayette as the center of government for Tippecanoe County."
