= Gouzangrez =

- Part of Commeny
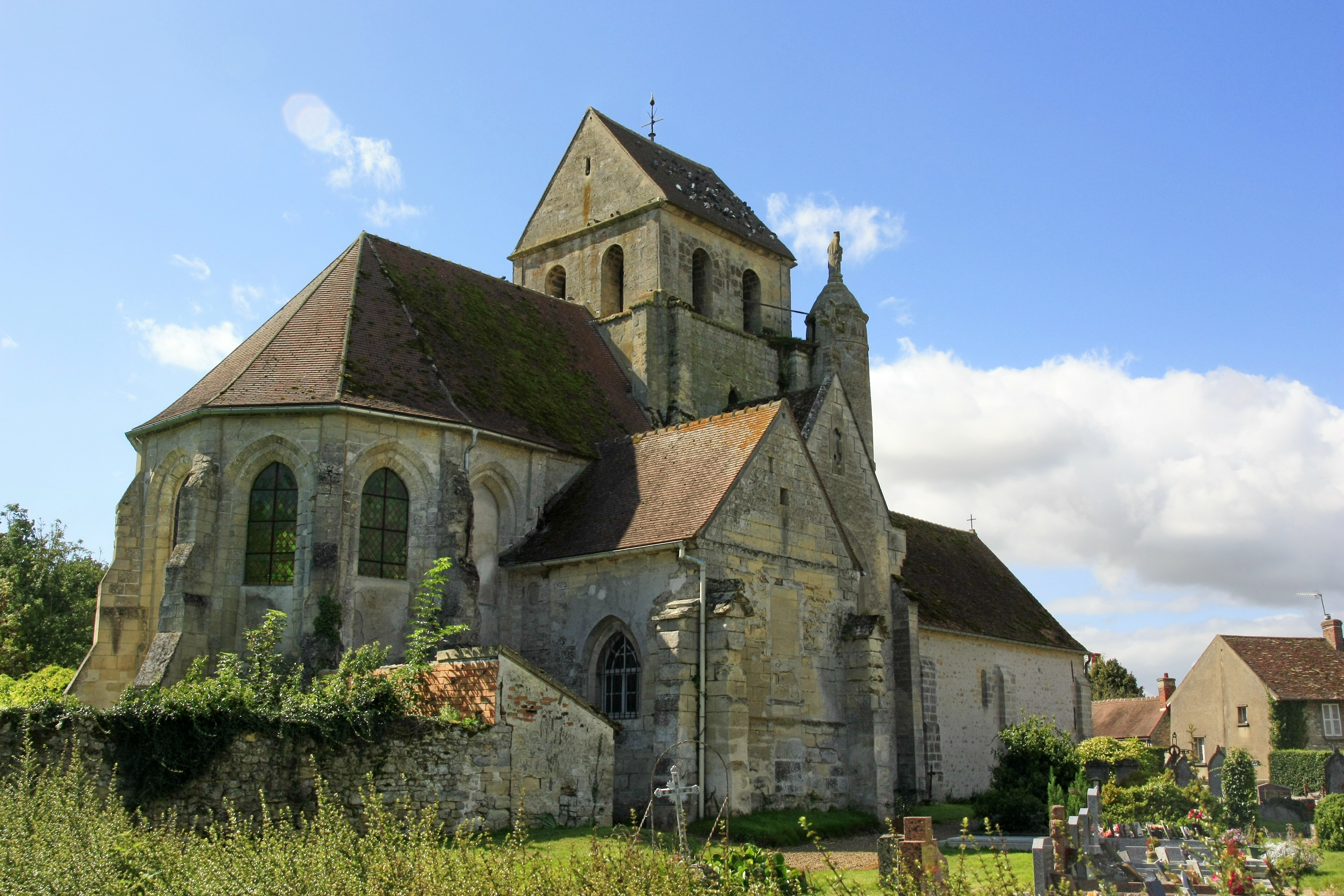
- The church of Our Lady of the Assumption, in Gouzangrez

- Coat of arms
- Location of Gouzangrez
- Location within France Location within Île-de-France (region)
- Coordinates: 49°06′48″N 1°54′27″E
- Country: France
- Region: Île-de-France
- Department: Val-d'Oise
- Arrondissement: Pontoise
- Canton: Pontoise
- Commune: Commeny
- Area^{1}: 0.77 km^{2} (0.30 sq mi)
- Highest elevation: 114 m (374 ft)
- Lowest elevation: 101 m (331 ft)
- Population (2021): 151
  - Density: 200/km^{2} (510/sq mi)
- Time zone: UTC+01:00 (CET)
  - Summer (DST): UTC+02:00 (CEST)
- Postal code: 95450
- ^{1} French Land Register data, which excludes lakes, ponds, glaciers > 1 km^{2} (0.386 sq mi or 247 acres) and river estuaries.

Gouzangrez (French pronunciation: [ɡuzɑ̃ɡʁe]) is a former commune in the Val-d'Oise department and Île-de-France region of France. On 1 January 2024, it was merged into the commune of Commeny.

== See also ==
- Communes of the Val-d'Oise department
