= Boreyko coat of arms =

Polish coat of arms

Boreyko
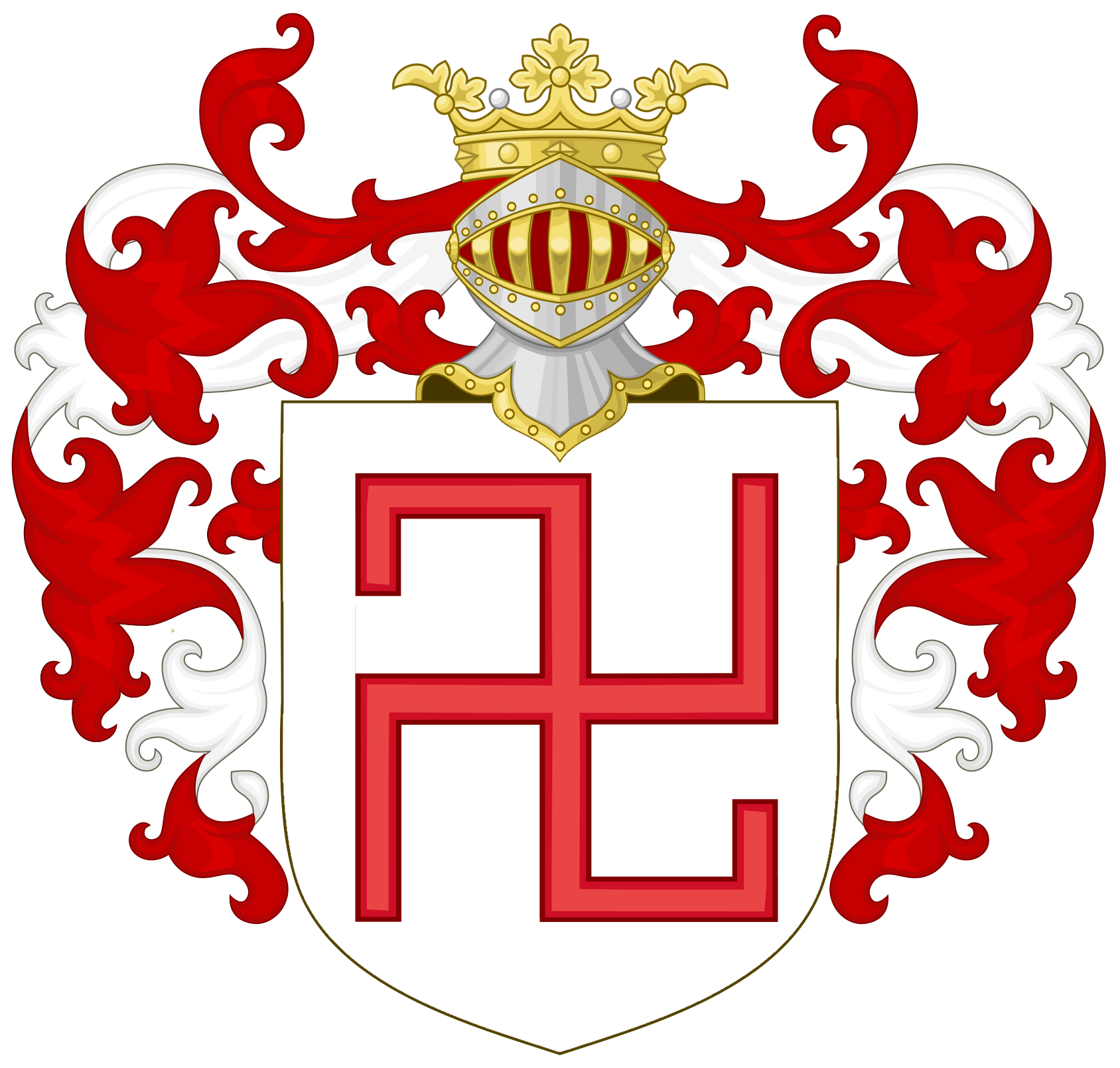
- Battle cry: -
- Alternative name: Borejko
- Earliest mention: 1410 Horodle
- Towns: none
- Families: Borejko, Boreyko, Borejka, Borzym, Radzichowski, Radziechowski, Radzikowski

Boreyko is a Polish coat of arms. It was used by several szlachta families in the times of the Polish–Lithuanian Commonwealth.

== History ==
The symbol of a swastika was also popular with the nobility. Prior to Christianity, this sign was painted on the shields of knights. According to chronicles, prince Oleg who in the 9th century with his Rus Vikings had captured Constantinople, had nailed his shield to the cities gates, which had a large red Swastika painted on it. The noble house of Boreyko from Ruthenia also had swastikas as their coat of arms. The family had reached its greatness in the 14th and 15th centuries and their arms can be seen in many heraldry books produced at that time. The origin of the family is tracked back to the eastern regions of today's Ukraine. During several centuries the Boreyko noble families united against the Tsar Kingdom of Russia.

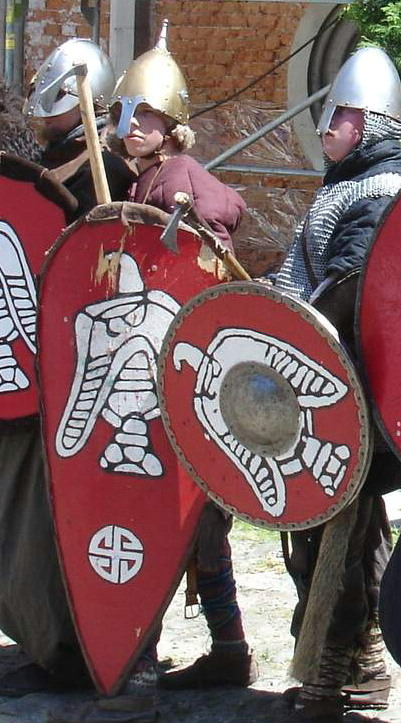
White swastika painted on Viking shields (historical re-enactment, Bielsko-Biała, Poland)

== Blazon ==
On silver shield figure at swastika form, which vertical pillar on ends twince broken. Crown over helmet, by Samuel Orgelbrand.

== Notable bearers ==
Notable bearers of this coat of arms include: Borejko, Boreyko, Boyko, Borejka, Borzym, Radzichowski, Radziechowski.

During the Second World War families by these surnames living in the Polish–Lithuanian regions changed them in order to avoid persecution by the Soviet and/or Nazi authorities.

Alternative surnames : Bouejko, Bolejko, Borym, Radzikowski, etc.

- Walery Eljasz-Radzikowski painter and photographer
- Andrey Boreyko conductor

== See also ==
- Polish heraldry
- Heraldic family
- List of Polish nobility coats of arms

== Bibliography ==
- Gajl, Tadeusz (2007). Herbarz polski od średniowiecza do XX wieku: ponad 4500 herbów szlacheckich 37 tysięcy nazwisk 55 tysięcy rodów [Polish Armorial Middle Ages to 20th Century] (in Polish). Gdańsk: L&L. ISBN 978-83-60597-10-1 – via Gajl.wielcy.pl.
- Encyklopedia powszechna Samuela Orgelbranda, 1901.
