= Thanks Badge =

Thanks Badge may refer to:

- Thanks Badge (GSUSA) and Thanks Badge II used by the GSUSA
- Thanks Badge (Scouting) used by the Scouting Association prior to World War II
