= L. A. Ring =

Danish artist

Laurits Andersen Ring
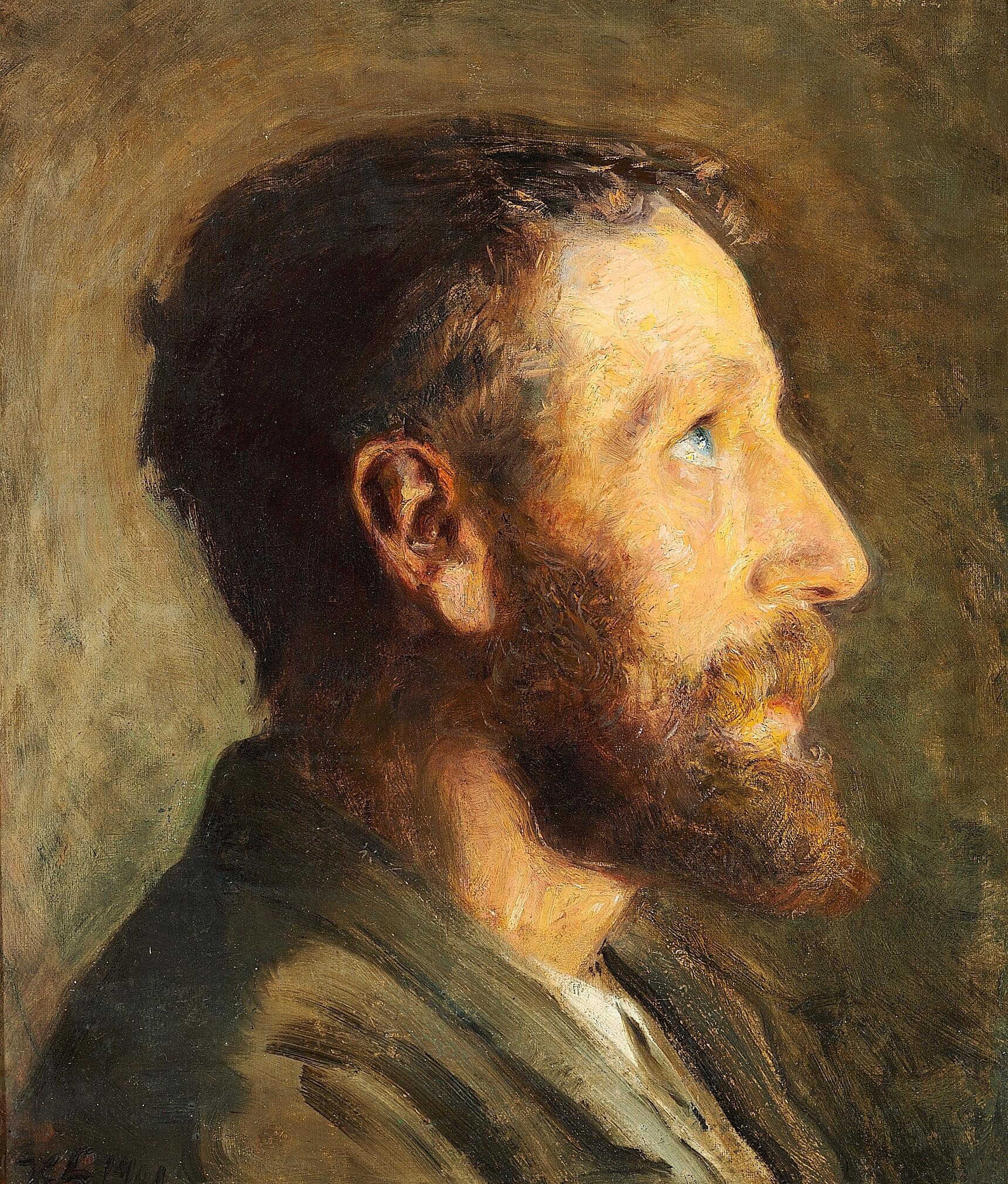
- The Painter L. A. Ring, 1901 by Knud Erik Larsen
- Born: Laurits Andersen; 15 August 1854; Ring, Denmark
- Died: 10 September 1933 (aged 79); Sankt Jørgensbjerg, Denmark
- Education: Royal Danish Academy of Fine Arts
- Known for: Painting
- Movement: Symbolism; Social realism
- Spouse: Sigrid Kähler

Laurits Andersen Ring (Danish pronunciation: [ˈlɑwʁits ˈɑnɐsn̩ ˈʁeŋˀ]; 15 August 1854 – 10 September 1933) was one of the foremost Danish painters of the turn of the 20th century, who pioneered both symbolism and social realism in Denmark. Considered one of the masterpieces of Danish culture, his painting Summer Day by Roskilde Fjord was included in the 2006 Danish Culture Canon.

== Life ==
Ring was born as Laurits Andersen in a village named Ring in southern Zealand. Ring's parents were wheelmaker and carpenter Anders Olsen (1816–83) and farmer's daughter Johanne Andersdatter (1814–95). In 1869, he became a painter's apprentice because his older brother was to take over the father's workshop. In 1873, while working in Copenhagen Laurits decided to take classes in painting, and after two years of private studies he was accepted at the Danish Academy of Arts in 1875 and studied briefly with painter P. S. Krøyer. He was never content with the academy and disliked the strict training in classical disciplines.

In 1881, he and his friend, the painter Hans Andersen from the village of Brændekilde, decided to change their last names, taking the names of their native villages, in order to avoid confusion at their joint exhibition. Laurits became L. A. Ring, and his friend Hans became H. A. Brendekilde. Ring's first exhibition took place in 1882, but he did not acquire recognition until 1884, the year in which he finished The Railroad Guard (Banevogteren, 1884). At this time, Denmark was in political turmoil, as the Council President Estrup had bypassed democratic rule and governed through decrees. Ring was politically active in the "Rifle movement", a revolutionary group of students taking up arms training in preparation for a rebellion. Ring became increasingly interested in the difficulties of the poor and social justice for the lower classes.

While he lived in Copenhagen, he became a close friend of the family of lawyer and amateur painter Alexander Wilde. He spent Christmas and summers with the family and formed a close friendship with Wilde's wife, Johanne. Ring was deeply in love with her but she remained faithful to her husband, although the two exchanged frequent and intimate letters. Ring painted many tender portraits of Mrs. Wilde. As Ring realized that the relation would never materialize he turned his back on the Wildes, experiencing a time of intense depression. In 1893 he received a travel stipend and spent the year studying in Italy.

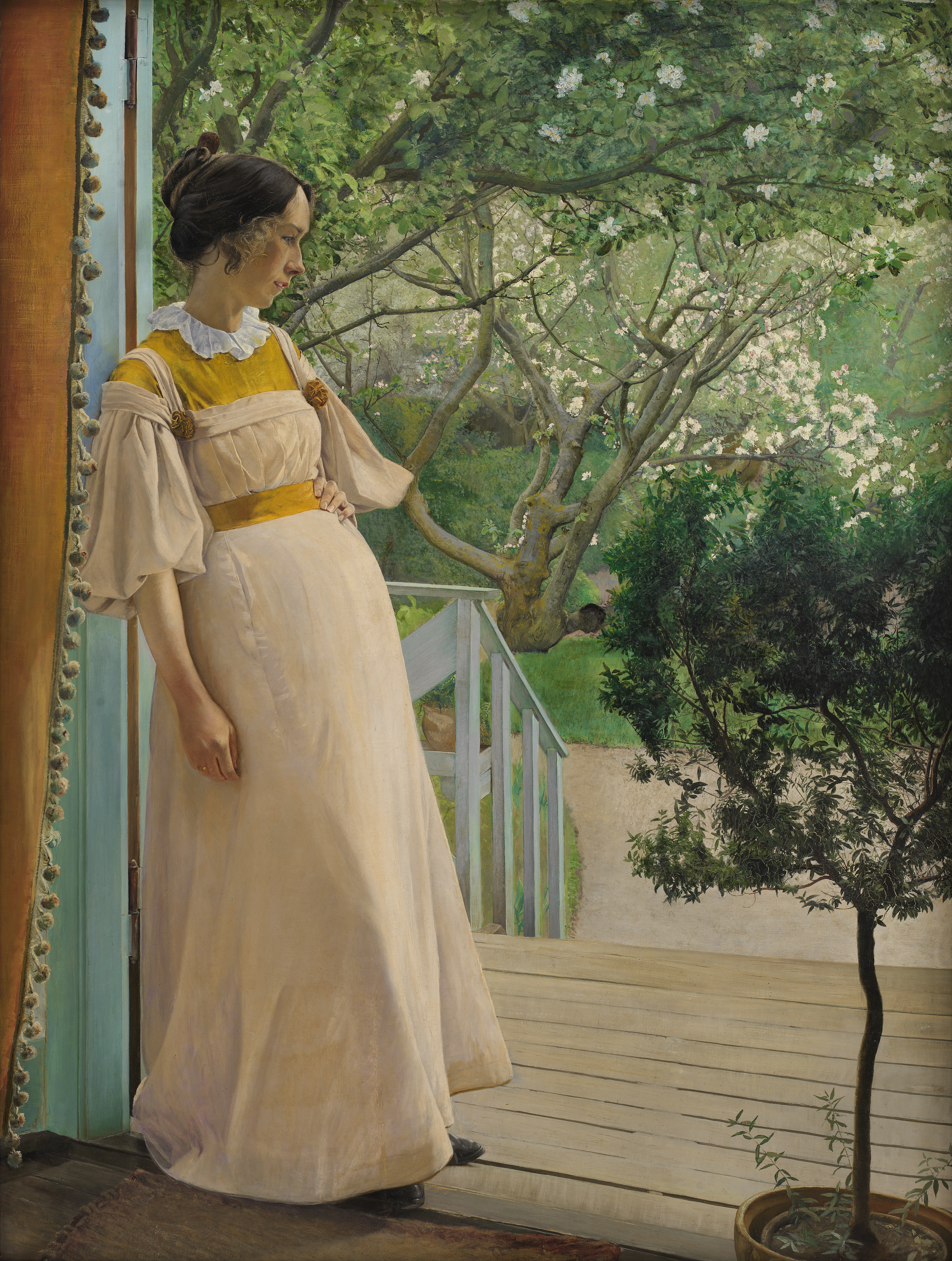
In the Garden Doorway, The Artist's Wife (1897), for which Ring received the Bronze medal at the 1900 World's Fair in Paris.

In 1894, Ring was used as a model for a character in the novel Night watch (Nattevagt) by the Danish author and later Nobel prize winner Henrik Pontoppidan, an old friend of his. Ring served as a model for the unflattering character Thorkild Drehling, a painter and failed revolutionary, who was in love with his best friend's wife. Ring did not object to the unflattering depiction, but he was offended that Pontoppidan would publicly divulge his infatuation with Johanne Wilde in that way. Ring, deeply hurt by Pontoppidan's betrayal of confidence, broke off his friendship, never giving an explanation.

Upon his return from Italy, he started working on a series of paintings with fellow painter Sigrid Kähler as a model. She was the daughter of ceramic artist Herman Kähler. In 1896 Ring married Kähler, who was only 21 years old at the time (he was 42). Living together in Karrebæksminde the couple had three children before Kähler died in 1923, at age 49. In 1900, he received the bronze medal at the World's Fair in Paris for his painting In the Garden Doorway, the Artist's Wife (I Havedøren, 1887). Their son, Ole Ring (1902-1972), also became a painter, and painted in a style highly influenced by that of his father.

For a while, he lived at Baldersbrønde near Hedehusene in the old school building, which was later to be the home of another painter, Ludvig Find. Ring produced several paintings from these towns. By 1913, Ring was a notable member of Denmark's artistic community and a censor at the Charlottenborg exhibitions. He had a house built at Sankt Jørgensbjerg in Roskilde, overlooking the fjord - here he spent the last decade of his life, before his death in 1933.

The year after Ring's death, the author Peter Hertz published a biography in which he summarized Ring's life and work: "His oeuvre remains as his life and essence: The still water of profound depth". Today there are examples of his work at practically every Danish art museum including the Hirschsprung Collection in Copenhagen.

== Style and motifs ==
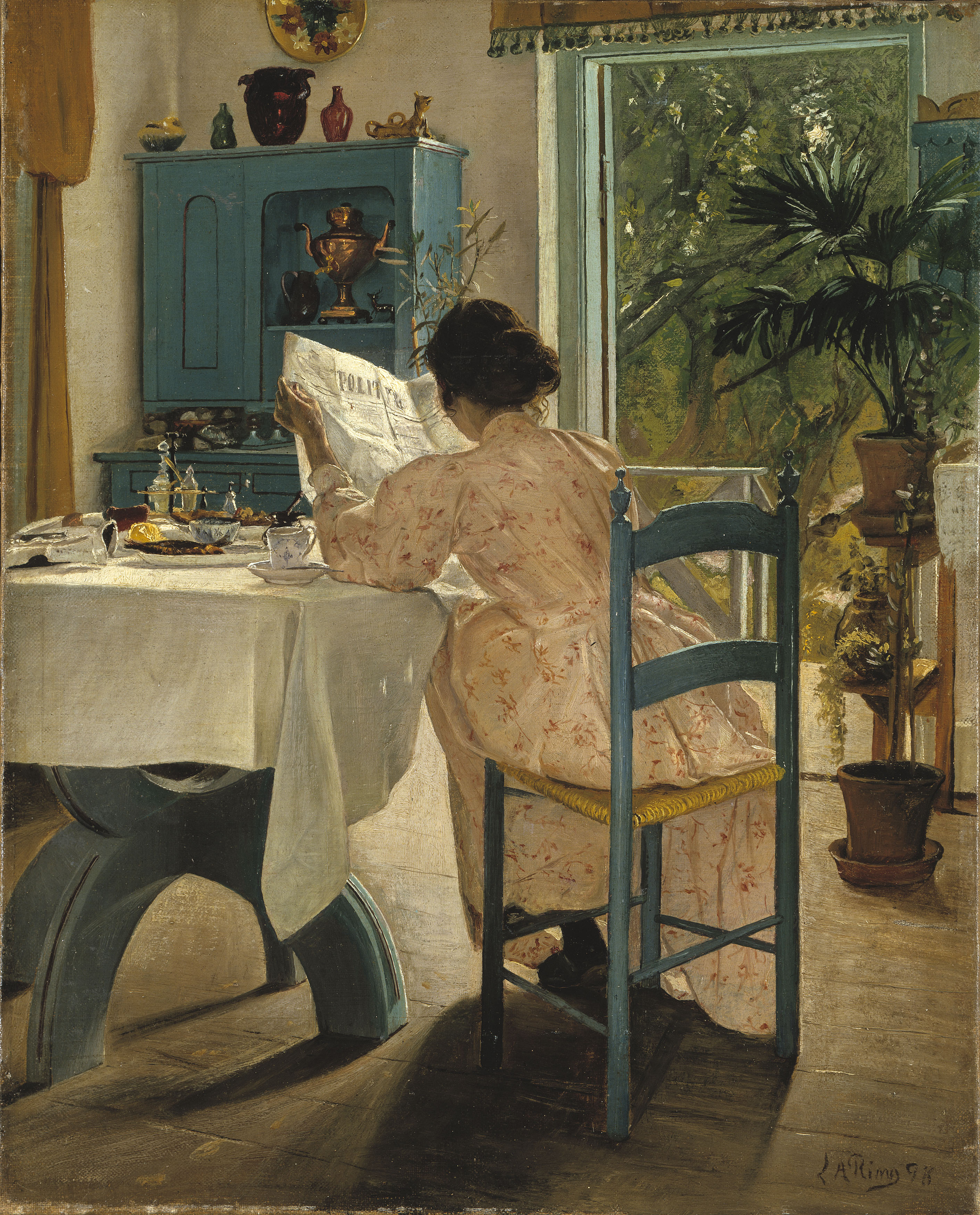
Ved frokostbordet og morgenaviserne [At Breakfast] (1898). The painters wife, Sigrid Kähler

A feature often seen in Ring's art is to place one or more objects at the edge of picture, which can be seen in e.g. Runesten ved Roskilde Landevej, Når taget ventes. Jernbaneoverkørsel ved Roskilde Landevej, Summerday by Roskilde Fjord and Lundbyes bænk ved Arresø. Ring also often places the horizontal line high, as seen in Lundbyes bænk ved Arresø, Krager på pløjemarken, På kirkegården i Fløng, Skærsommer. Tre børn i en mark med kornblomster and in his portrayal of rural laborers.

Ring drew on the Danish tradition of "almue" (folk) art, such as the work of J. th. Lundbye, but he also incorporated influences from more modernist painters such Paul Gauguin, Jean François Raffaëlli and Jean-François Millet. Early scholarship discussed whether Ring was best to be considered a realist or a symbolist painter, but later scholars have accepted that the two aspects of his work are equally important and complement each other.

The painting of Ring's wife, Sigrid Kähler, is surrounded by subtle symbols indicating his love for her, such as the myrtle branches above her head, a symbol of Aphrodite according to the Ancient Greeks, and used in Denmark to adorn the bride at weddings.

As a painter, Ring never distanced himself from his humble origin, but rather made it his dominant theme, depicting the reality of rural life. This is visible for example in his painting Gleaners (Axsamlere 1887) showing how the rural poor would pick up the grain left behind by the increasingly industrial methods of harvesting, a motif first made famous by Millet. Most of his paintings depict the village life and landscapes of southern Zealand from Præstø to Næstved. In his landscape painting, he was also inspired by psychological symbolism, infusing the landscapes with an otherworldly mystique and "strange mixtures of mood". This style has been described as "anti-naturalism".

Inspired by authors such as J.P. Jacobsen and the ideas of the Modern Breakthrough, Ring became an atheist, and his painting began to explore motifs and symbolism that contrasted forces of life and death. Even in his depictions of rural laborers Ring always played on the deeper symbolic and abstract meanings, so that his work The Harvester (I Høst 1884) becomes a depiction not just of a working man, nor of his brother who was the model, but of the cycle of life as symbolized by the scythe cutting the ripe corn.

Ring's consistent engagement with the unpleasant realities of life caused one critic to dub him "the Apostle of the Hideous". Others have interpreted the drive towards unsentimental realism as an expression of Ring's atheist life stance. Ring himself quipped on his 40th birthday that "Life is short - Art is long".

== Ring's circles of motifs ==
His entire work demonstrates a division between an attachment to tradition and the spirit of modernity. Many of his paintings depict crossings and thresholds: the space between waiting and leaving in a doorway, at a window or at a railroad crossing. This symbolism is visible for example in his painting In the Garden Doorway showing the artists wife, pregnant in the doorway between the living room and the garden with a background of gnarled and withered branches. Sometimes more than one circle of motif is present in a painting, e.g. Runesten ved Roskilde Landevej, which contains both the threshold and the road as circle of motif.

=== Portrayals of rural laborers ===
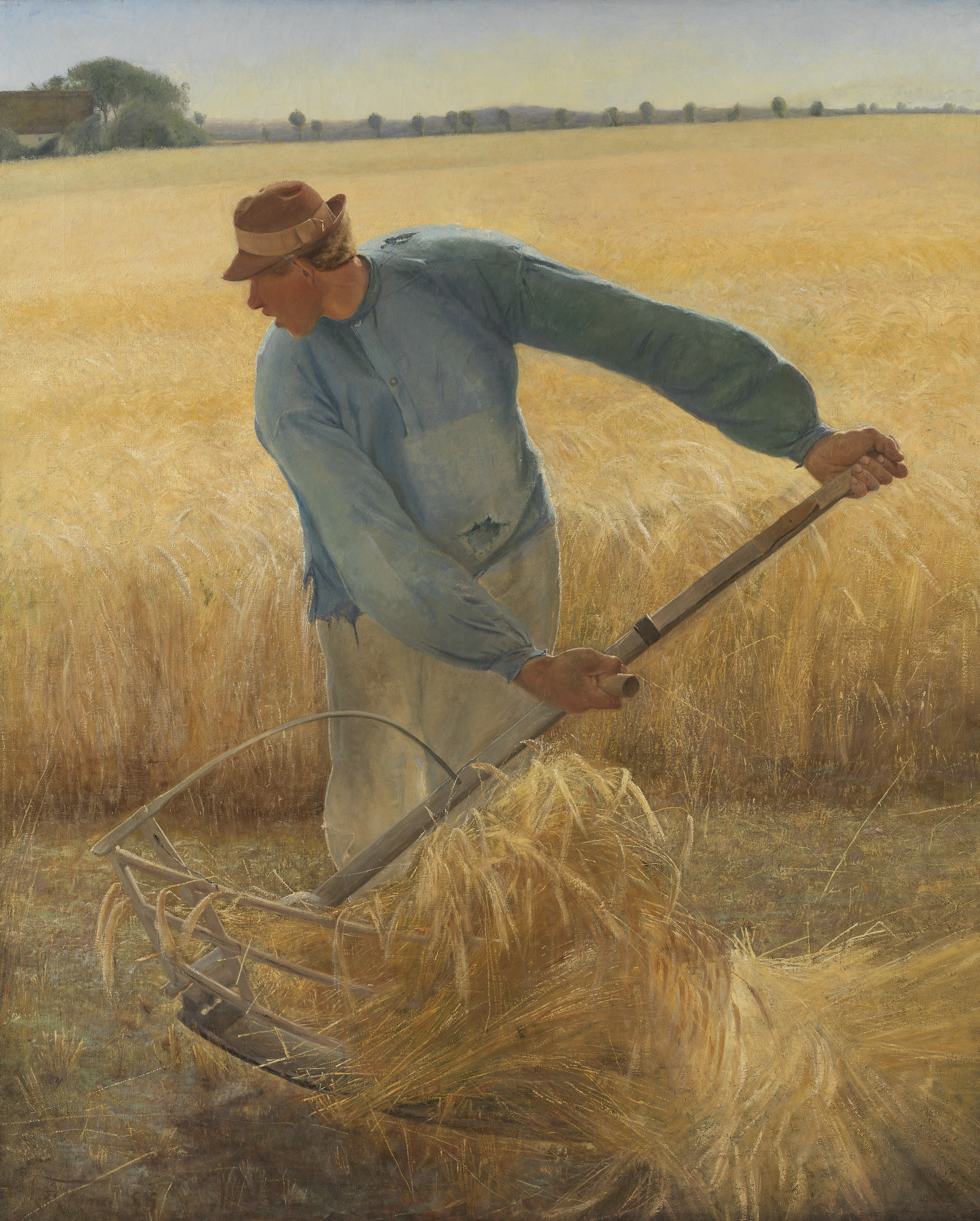
L.A. Ring, Harvest, 1885, The National Gallery of Denmark

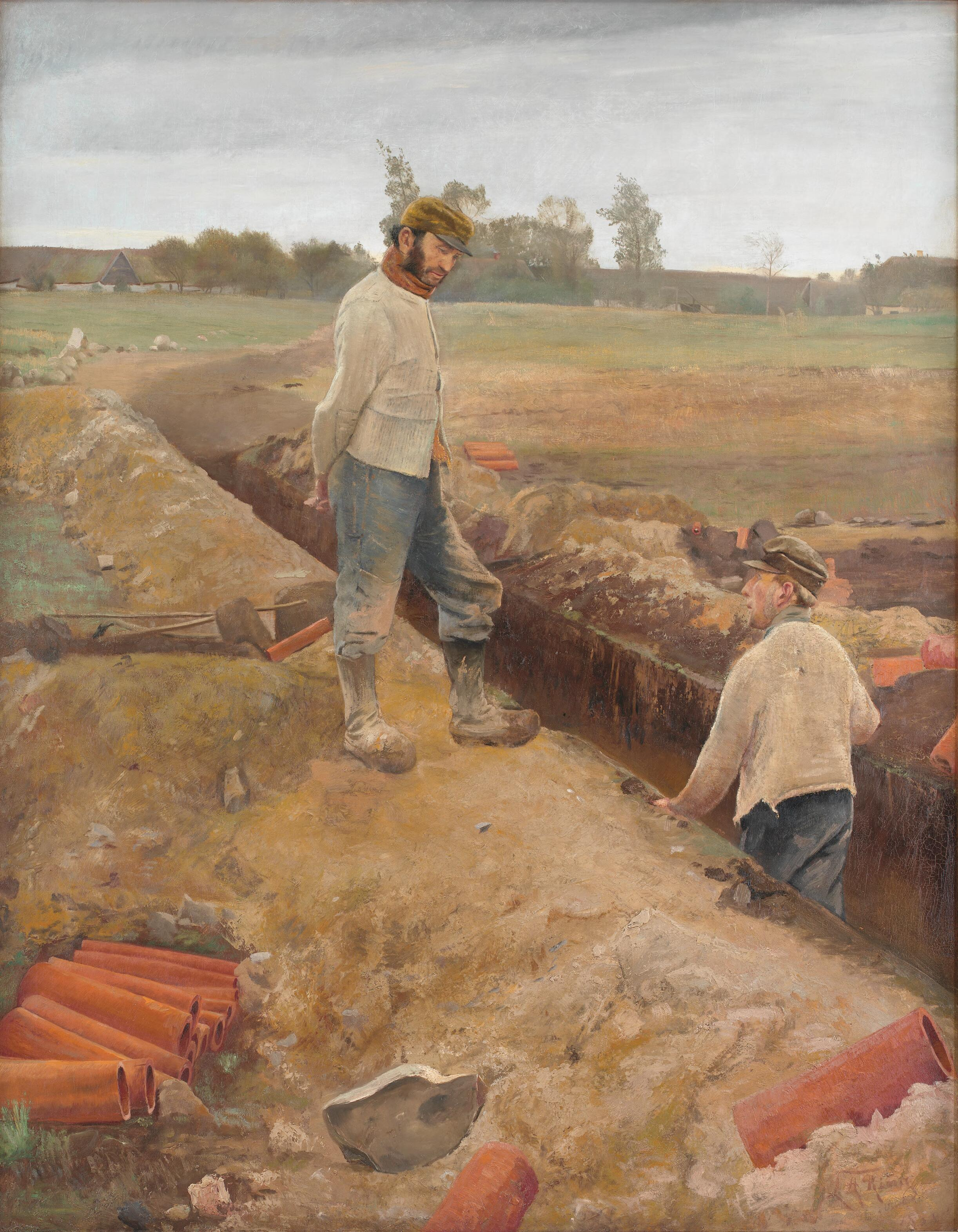
L.A. Ring, Drænrørsgraverne, 1885, The National Gallery of Denmark

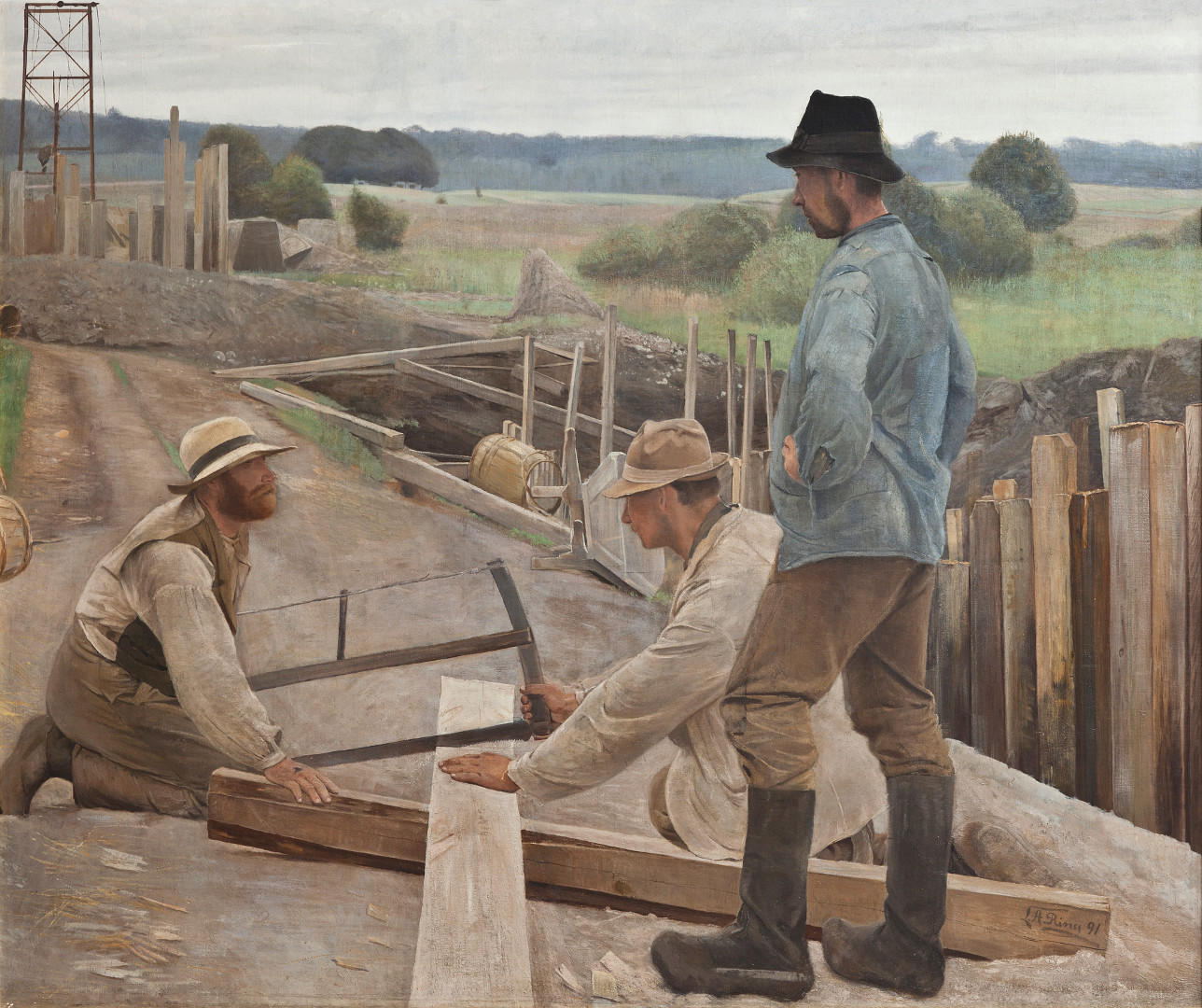
L.A. Ring, Arbejdere ved en vandledning ved Søndersø, 1901, Fuglsang Kunstmuseum

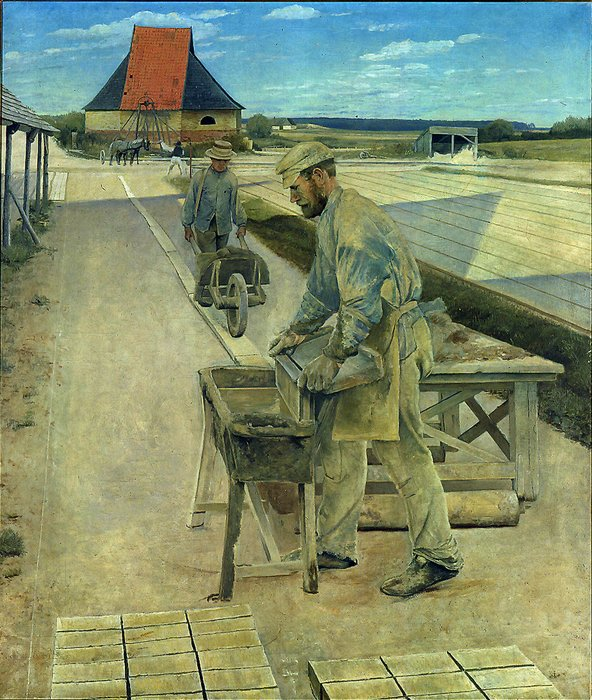
L.A. Ring, Teglværksarbejdere. Ladby teglværk, 1892, Vejen Kunstmuseum

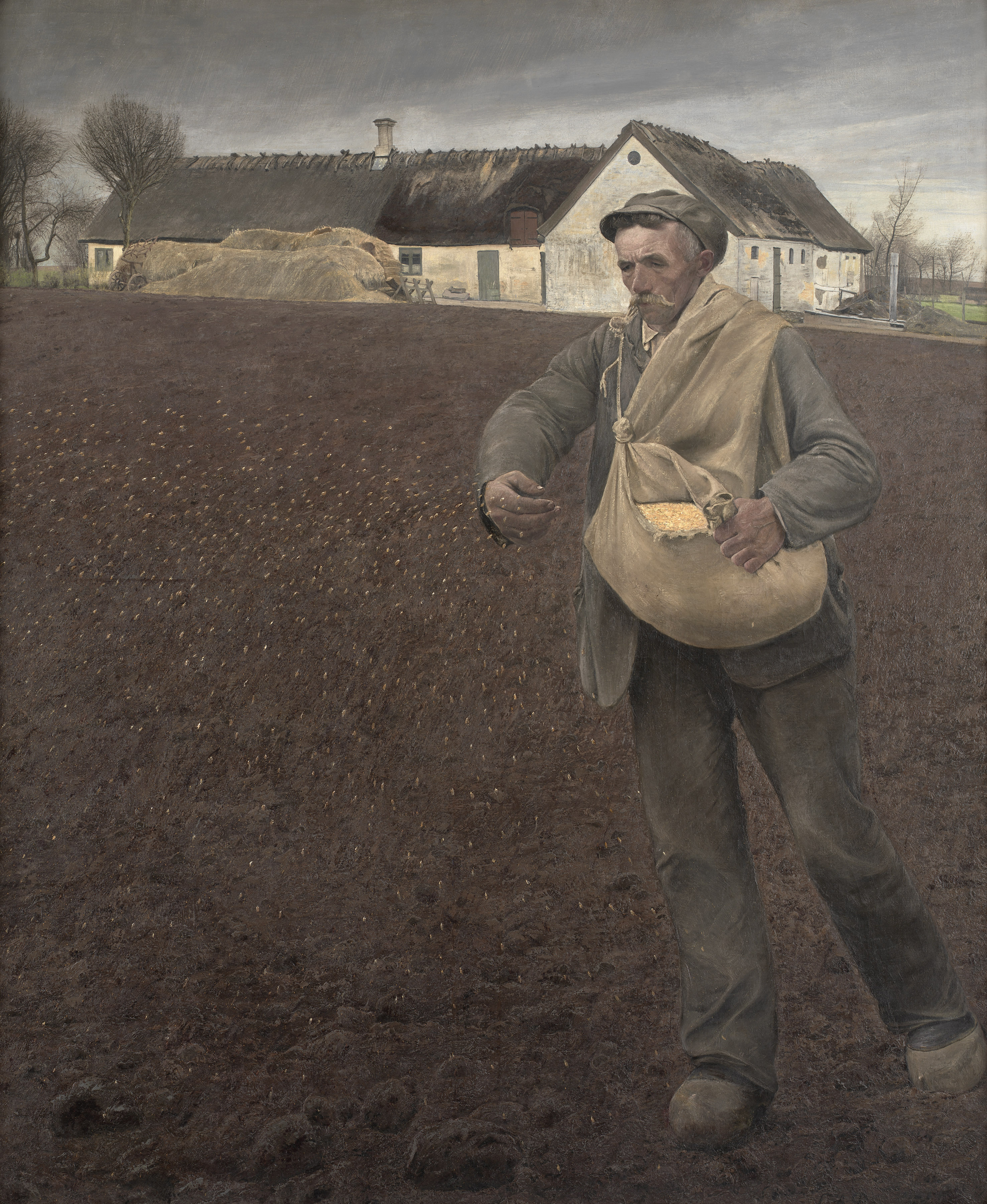
L.A. Ring, Sædemanden, 1910, Statsministeriet

Like Erik Henningsen and H. A. Brendekilde L.A. Ring painted social realistic portrayals of rural laborers, but not as noteworthy as Henningsen's En såret arbejder and Brendekilde's Udslidt. Ring does not attempt to cause pity or seek sympathy for the weak. Ring made a number of monumental portrayals of laborers, Harvest from 1885, Drænrørsgraverne also from 1885, Arbejdere ved en vandledning ved Søndersø from 1891, Teglværksarbejdere, Ladby Teglværk from 1892 and Sædemanden from 1910. They are all painted in the large format approximately 185 x 111,5 cm except from Drænrørsgraverne with the smaller format 142,5 x 111,5 cm.

The paintings all have a high horizontal line and the people do not tower into the sky in accordance with Ring's atheist attitude. Rather, they stay at the ground and have furthermore absorbed colour from the surroundings.

=== Death ===
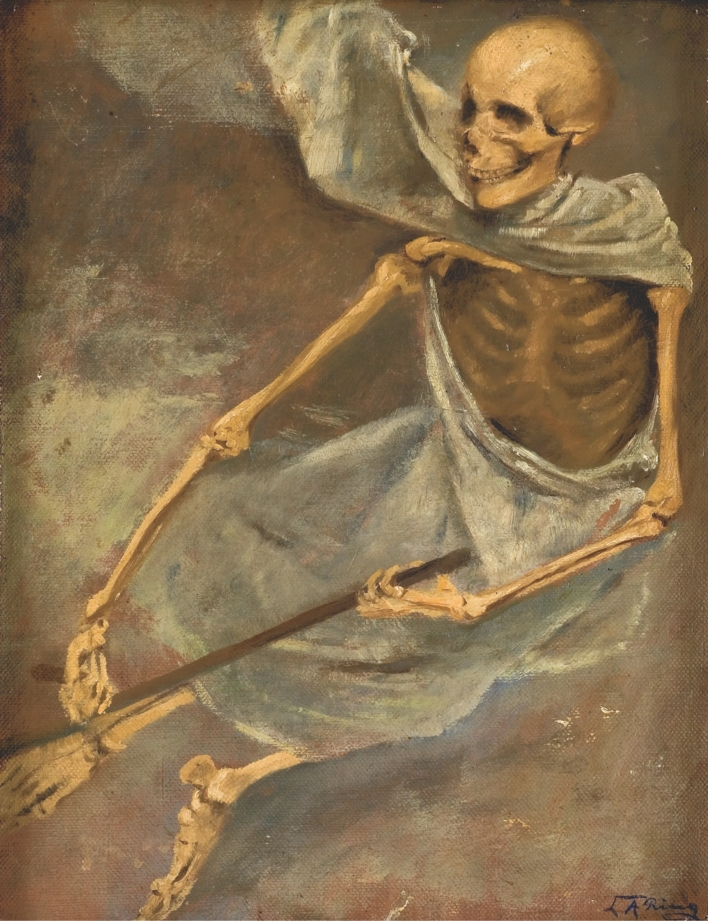
L.A. Ring, Skelet. Døden uden vinger, 1887, privately owned

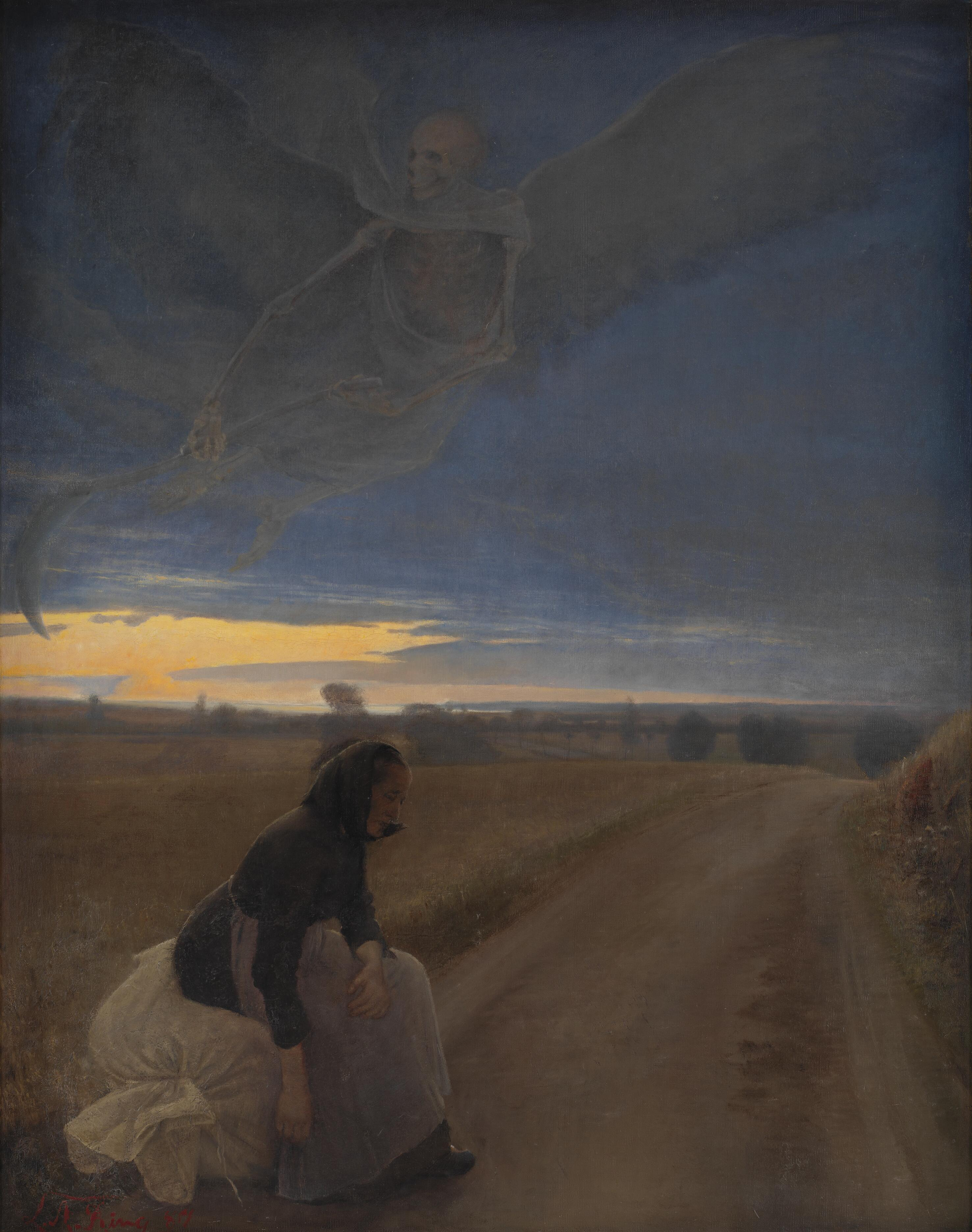
L.A. Ring, Aften. Den gamle kone og døden, 1887, The National Gallery of Denmark

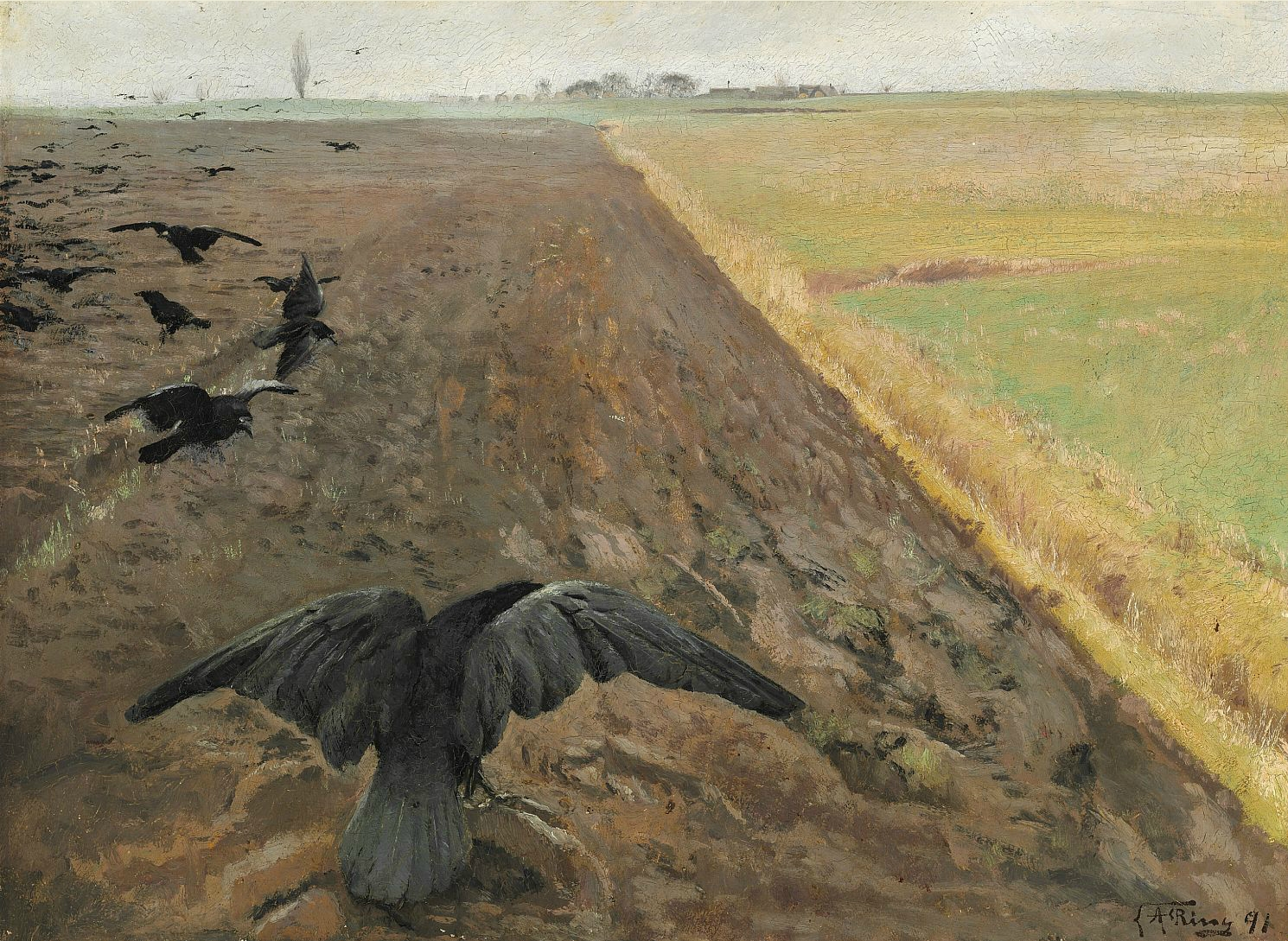
L.A. Ring, Raager på Pløjemarken, 1891, Toledo Museum of Art

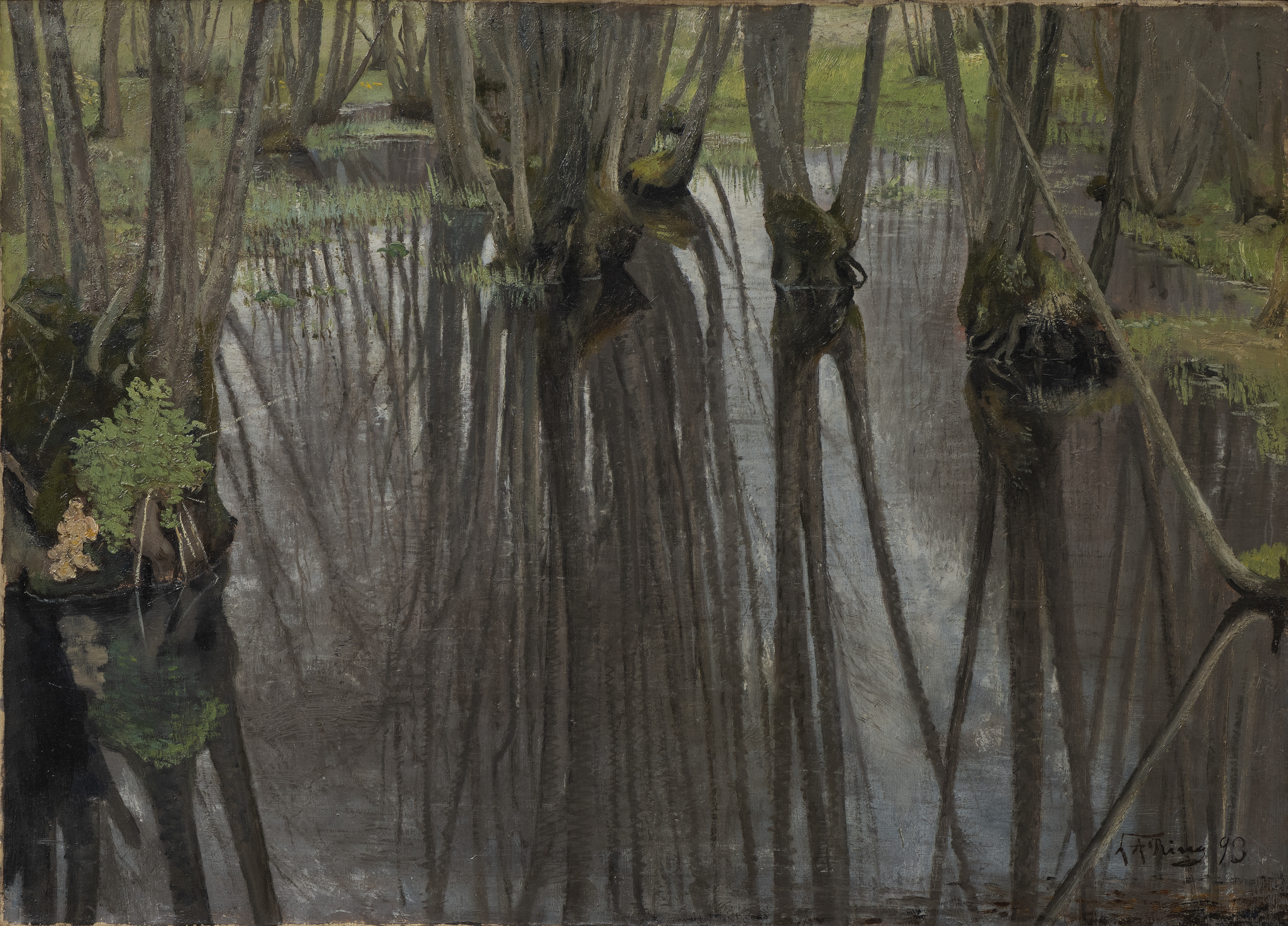
L.A. Ring, Elletrunter, 1893, owned by HM Queen Margrethe II of Denmark

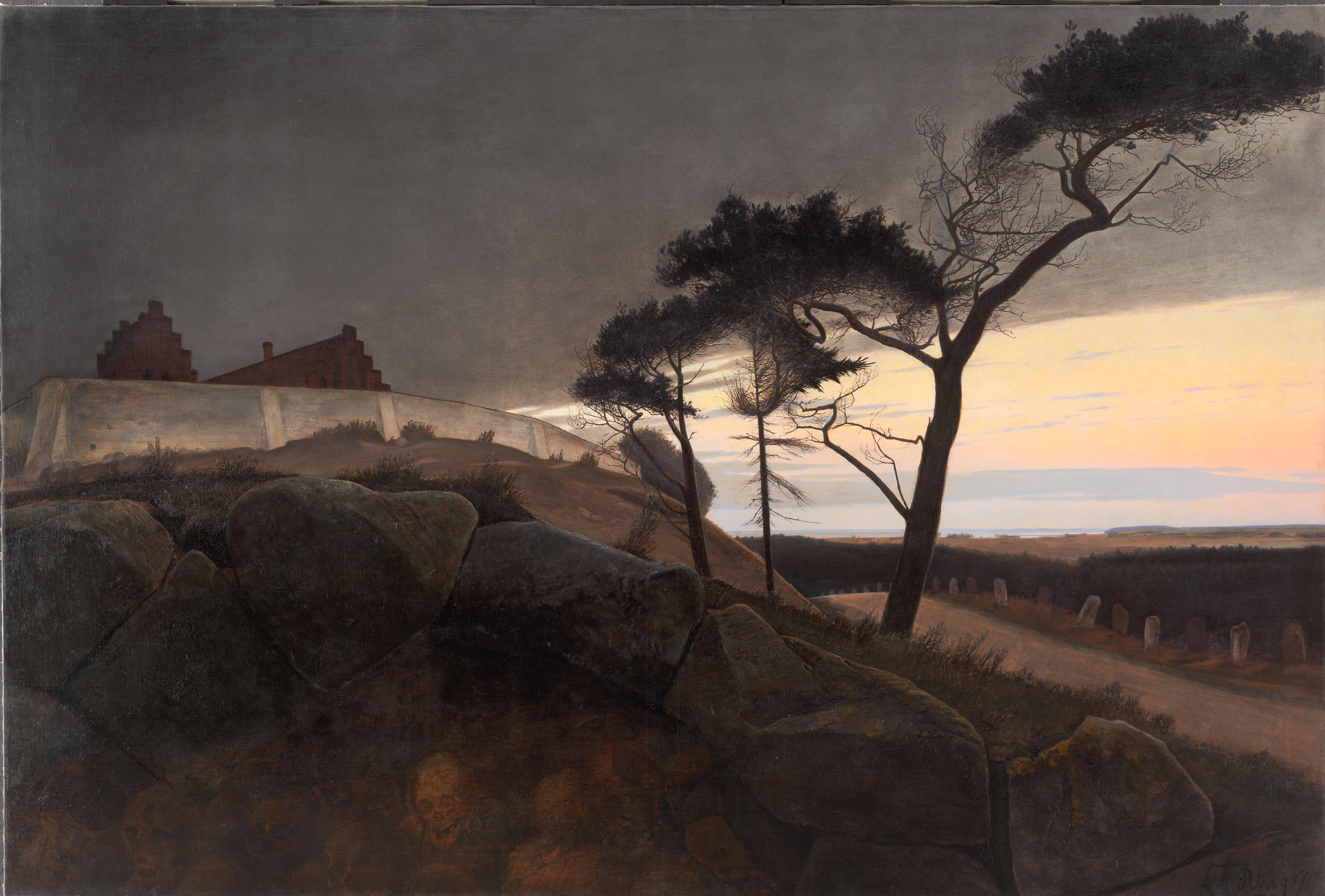
L.A. Ring, Efter solnedgang, "Nu skrider Dagen under, og Natten vælder ud", 1899, The National Gallery of Denmark

After the death of the brother in 1886 and until the return from Italy in 1895 Ring was very preoccupied with death and that left traces in his world of motifs as well in the landscape paintings as in the figure paintings. During the travel to Italy 1893-95 Ring had plans to paint a "dødedans" (dance of death). However, the idea was discarded and was instead incorporated in Efter solnedgang, "Nu skrider Dagen under, og Natten vælder ud, which represent the culmination of Ring's preoccupation with death as a motif in painting.

=== The Road ===
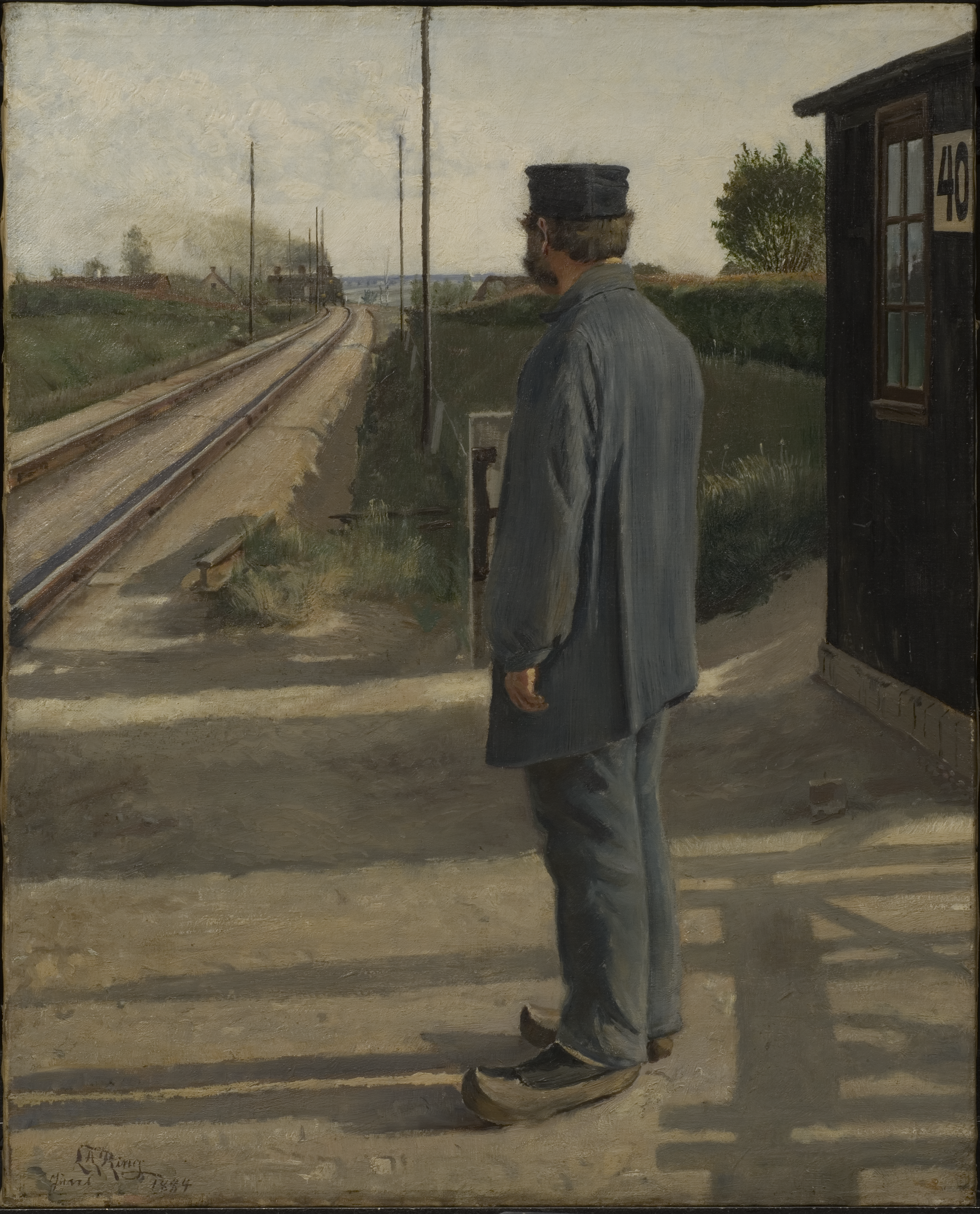
L.A Ring, The Railroad guard, 1884, Nationalmuseet

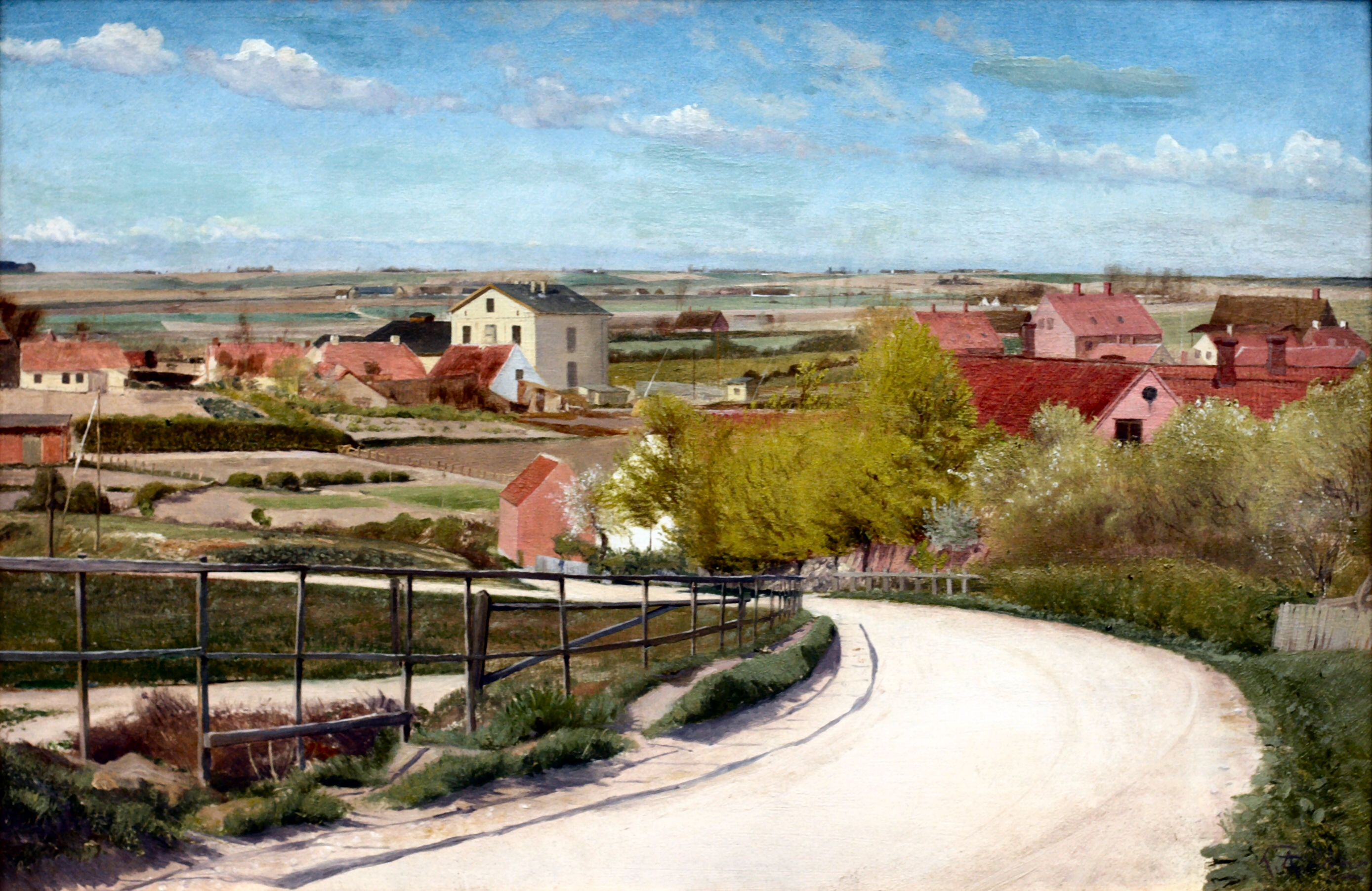
L.A. Ring, Kählers bygning bag Banken i Næstved, 1895, Randers Kunstmuseum

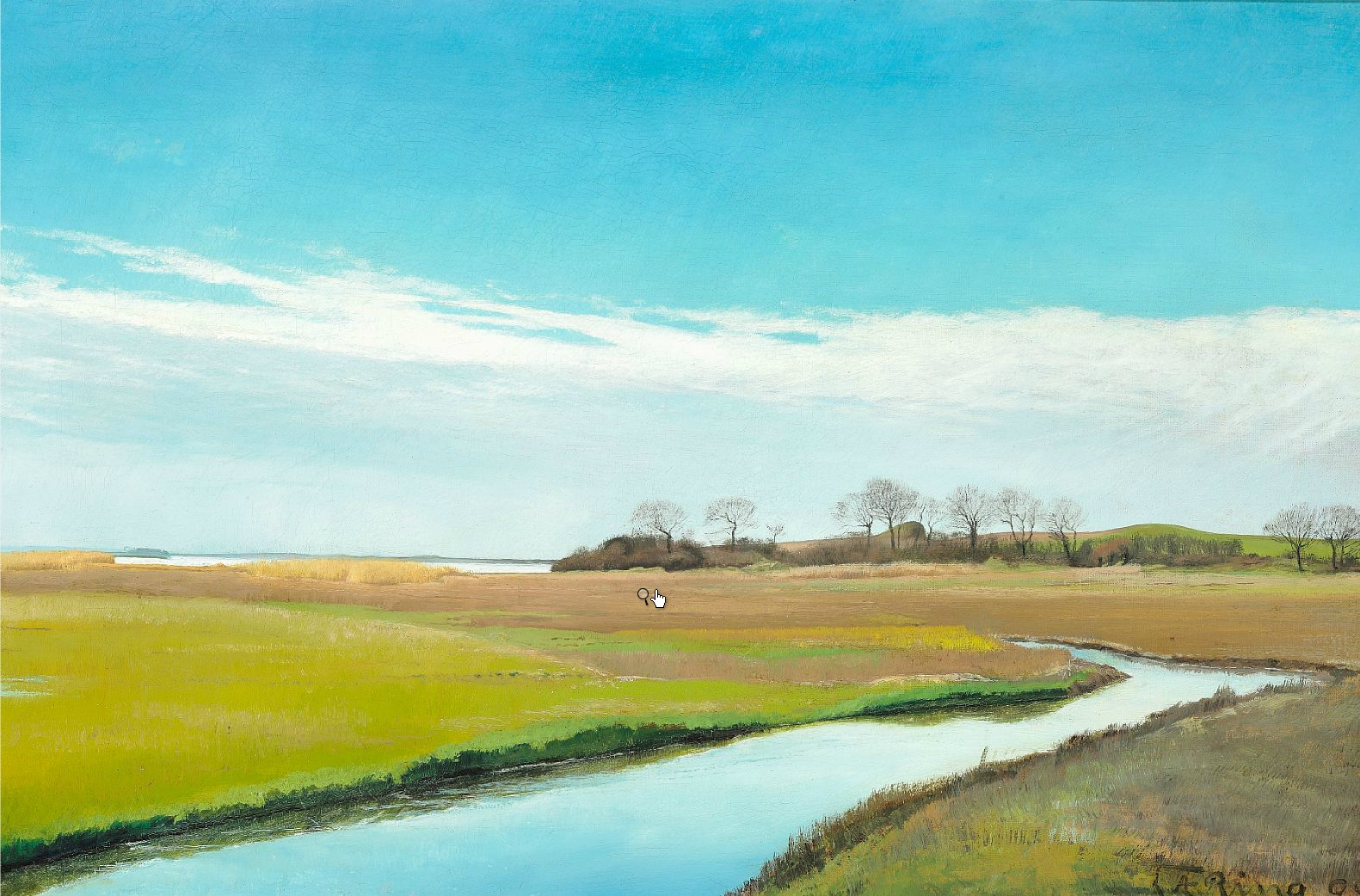
L.A. Ring, Aaløb gennem grønne Enge ved Sommertid, 1898

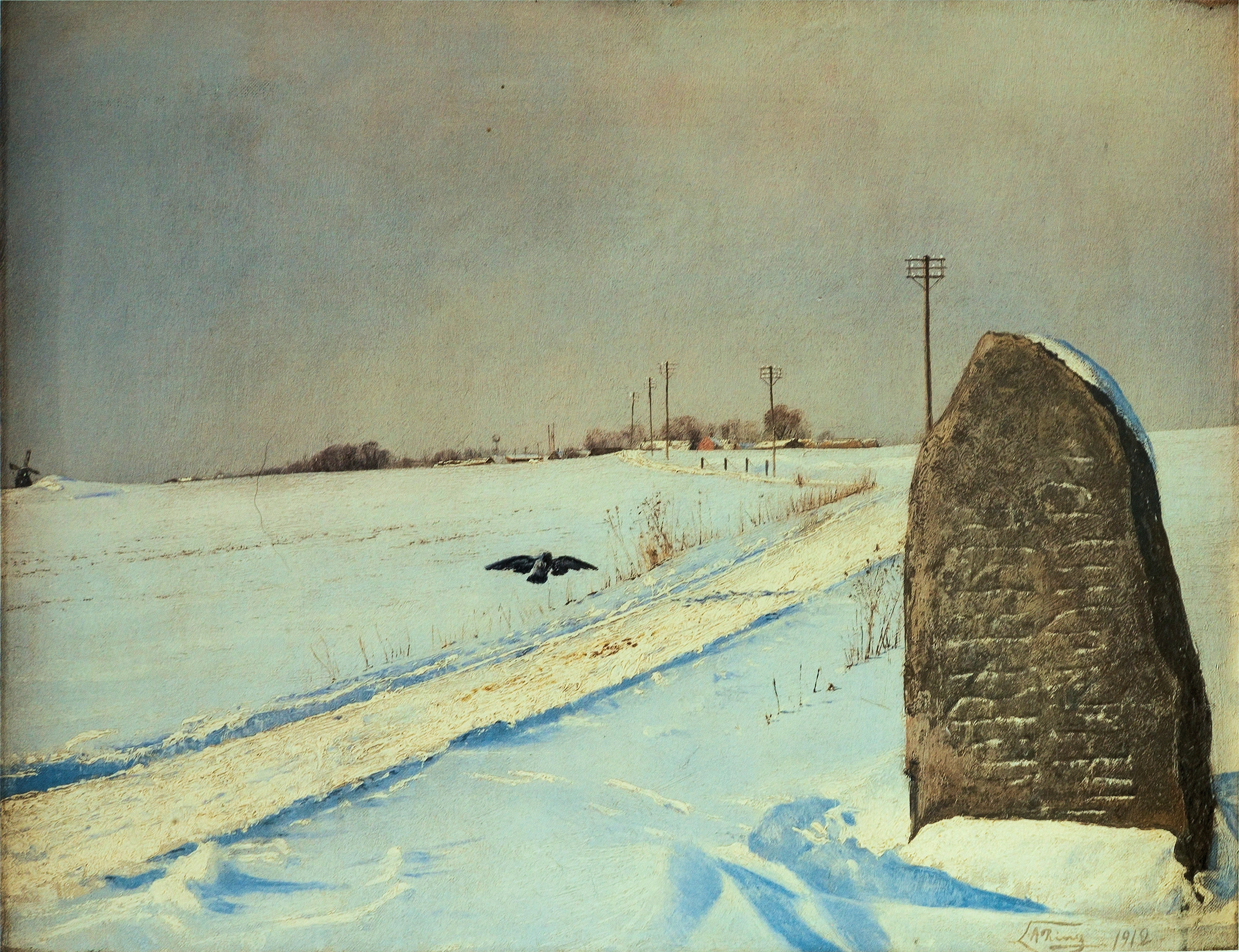
L.A. Ring, Runesten ved Roskilde Landevej, 1912, privately owned

In Ring's art the road and the path are recurring themes, and other lines such as creeks, rivers and estuaries, the open sea and modern elements e.g. bridges, railway tracks and telephone cables are used as main motifs. The roads lead the eye into the paintings and out again, as a symbol of the human existence.

=== Threshold ===
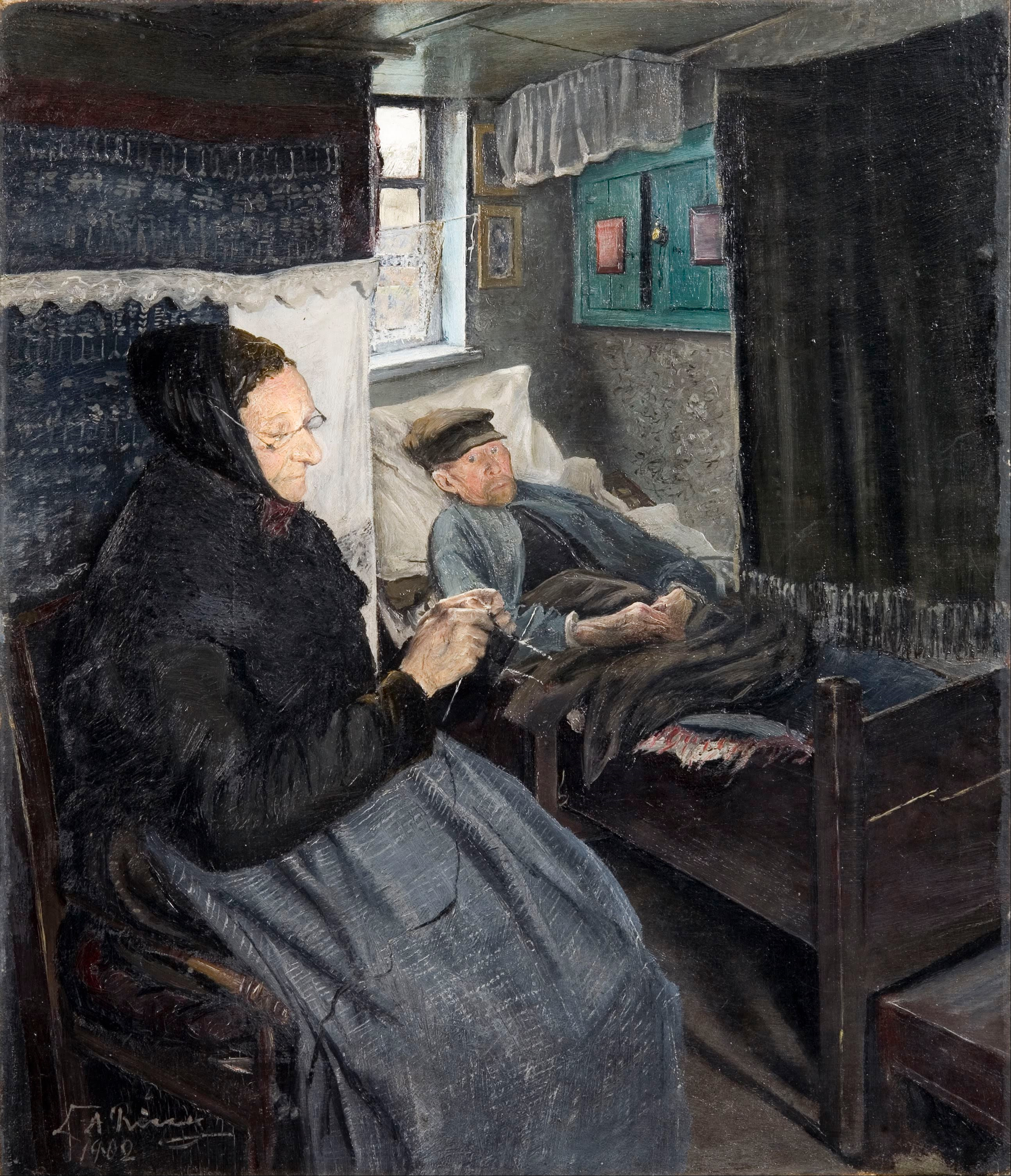
L.A. Ring, Den syge mand, 1902, Den Hirschsprungske Samling

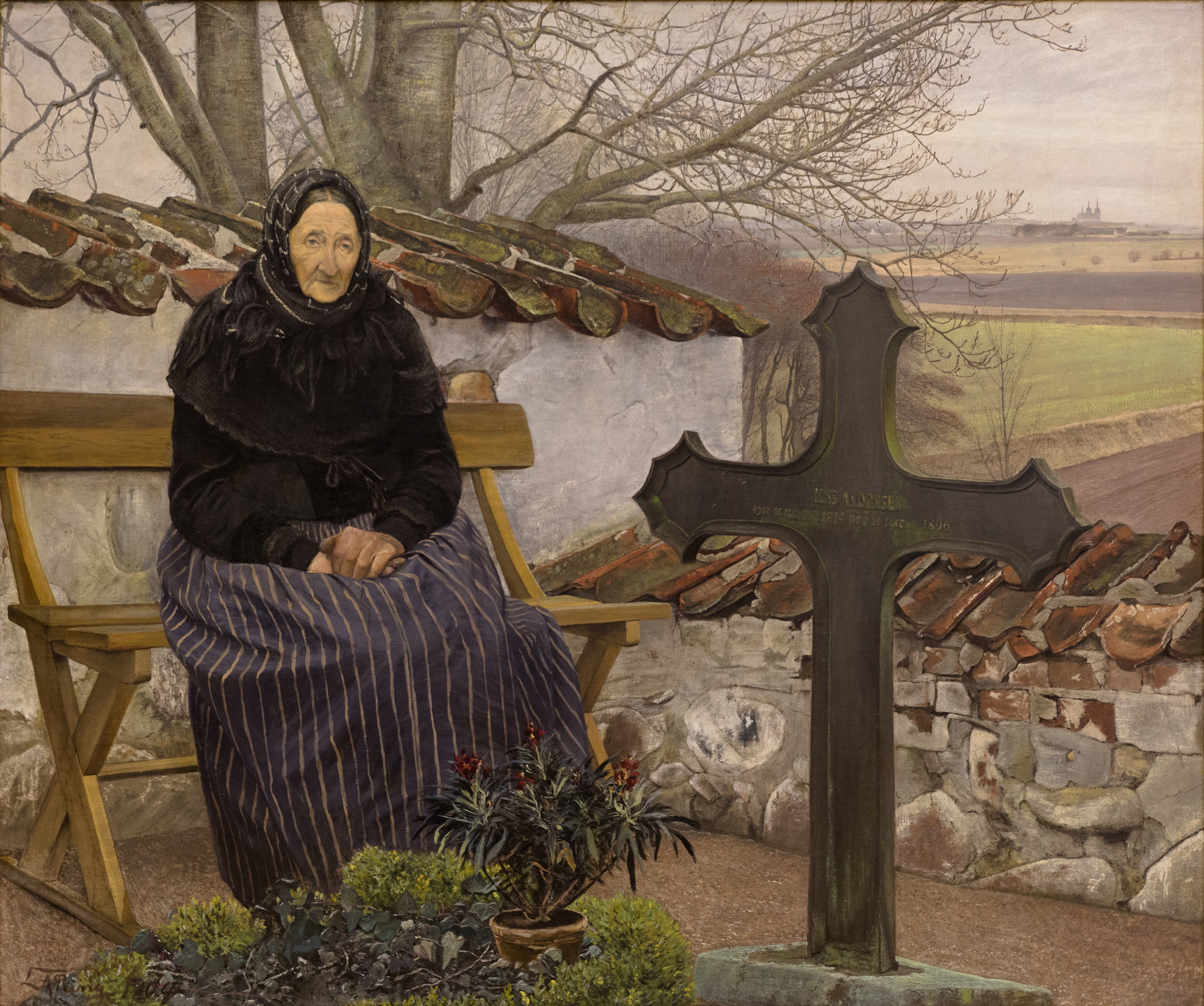
L.A. Ring, På kirkegården i Fløng, 1904, Statens Museum for Kunst

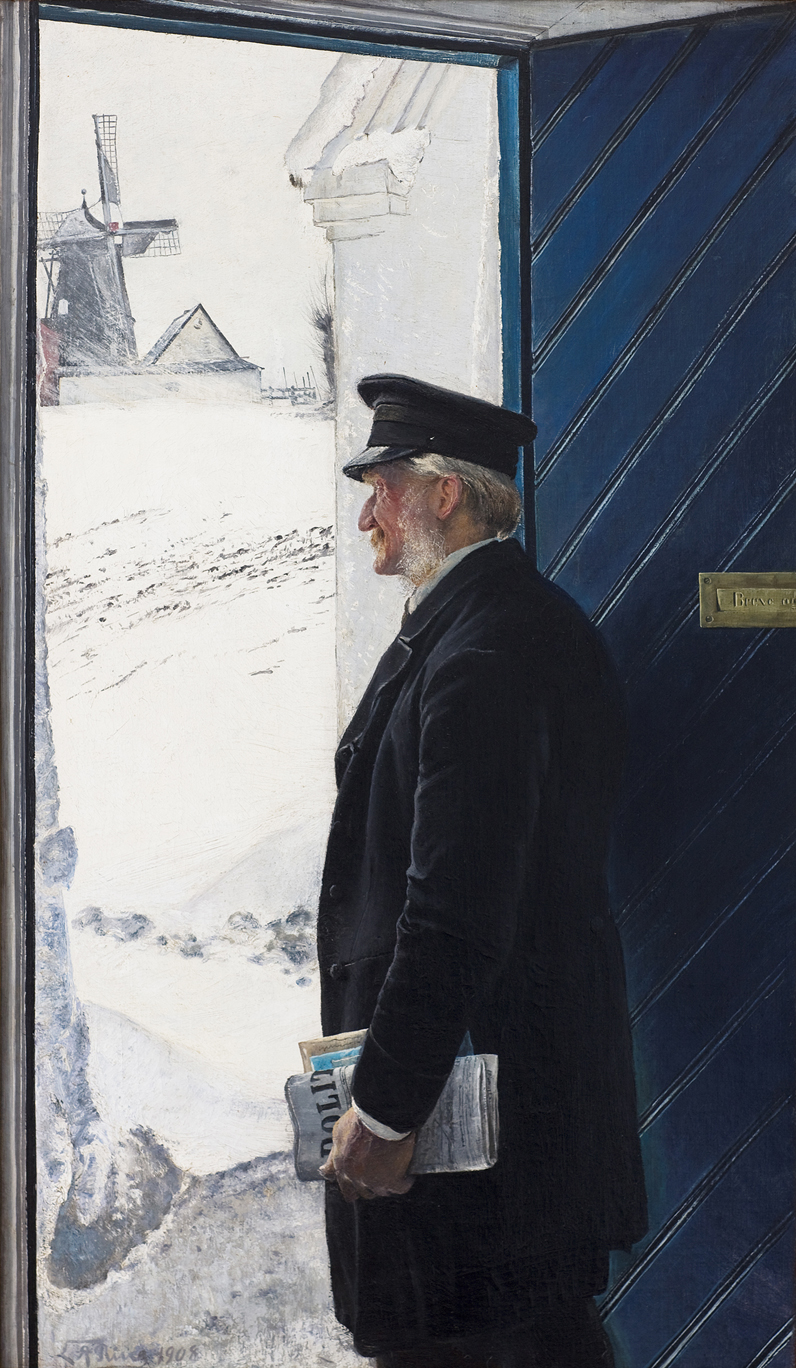
L.A. Ring, Stygt vejr. Baldersbrønde, 1908, Ribe Kunstmuseum

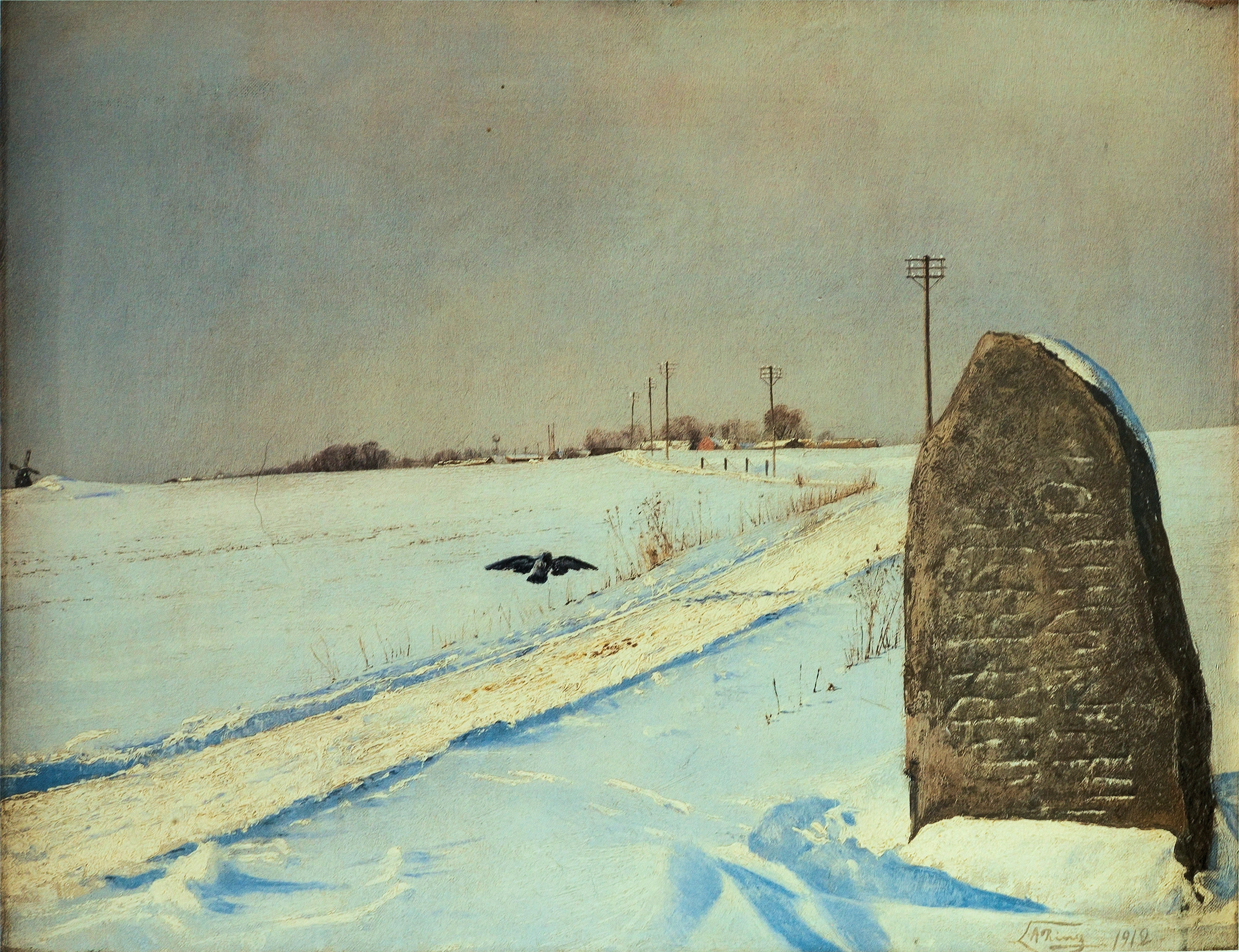
L.A. Ring, Runesten ved Roskilde Landevej, 1912, privately owned

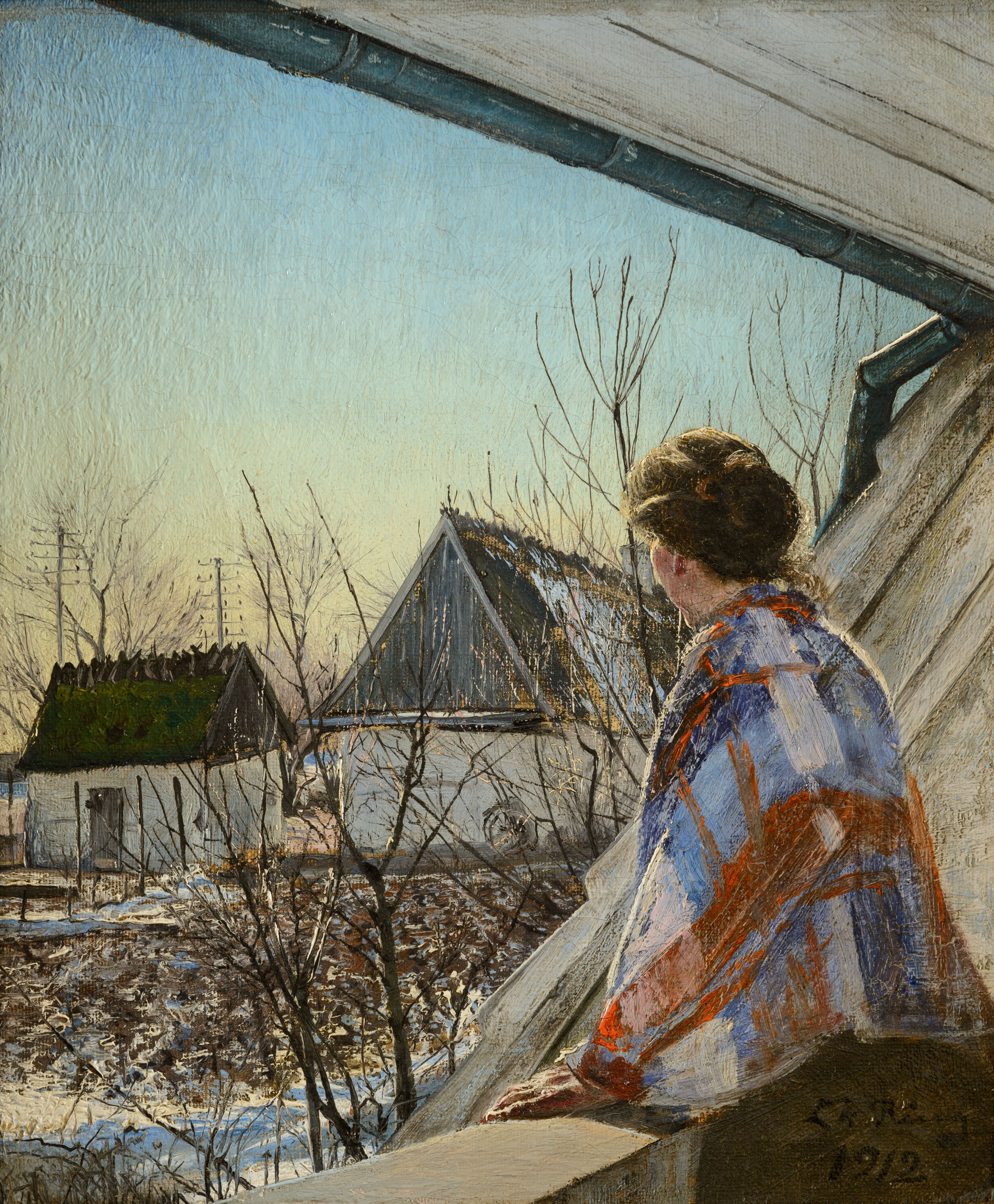
L.A. Ring, Fru_Sigrid_Ring_siddende_paa_et_Stenbalustre, 1912, Van der Meij Fine Arts (Amsterdam)

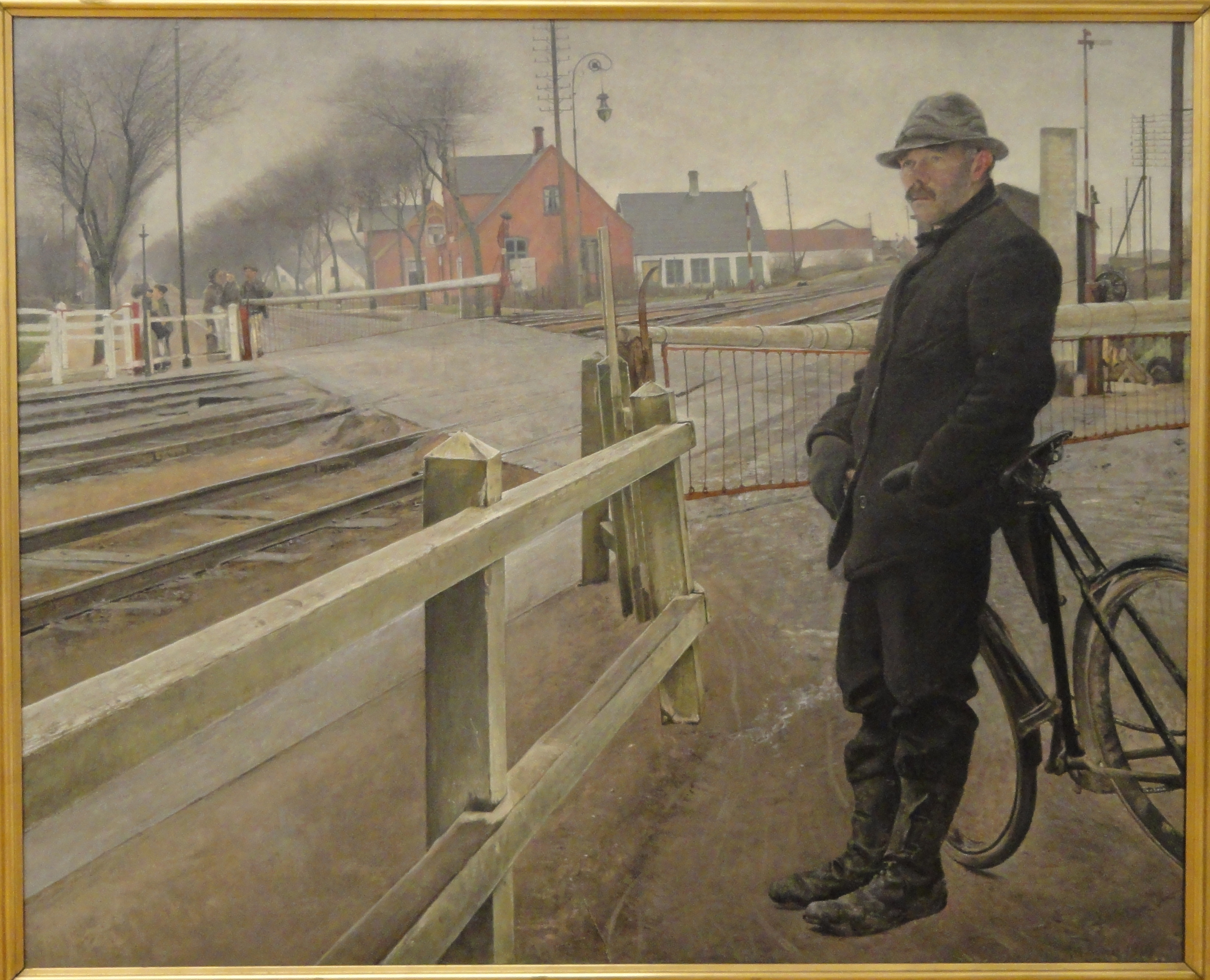
L.A Ring, Når toget ventes - Jernbaneoverskæring ved Roskilde Landevej, 1914, Statens Museum for Kunst

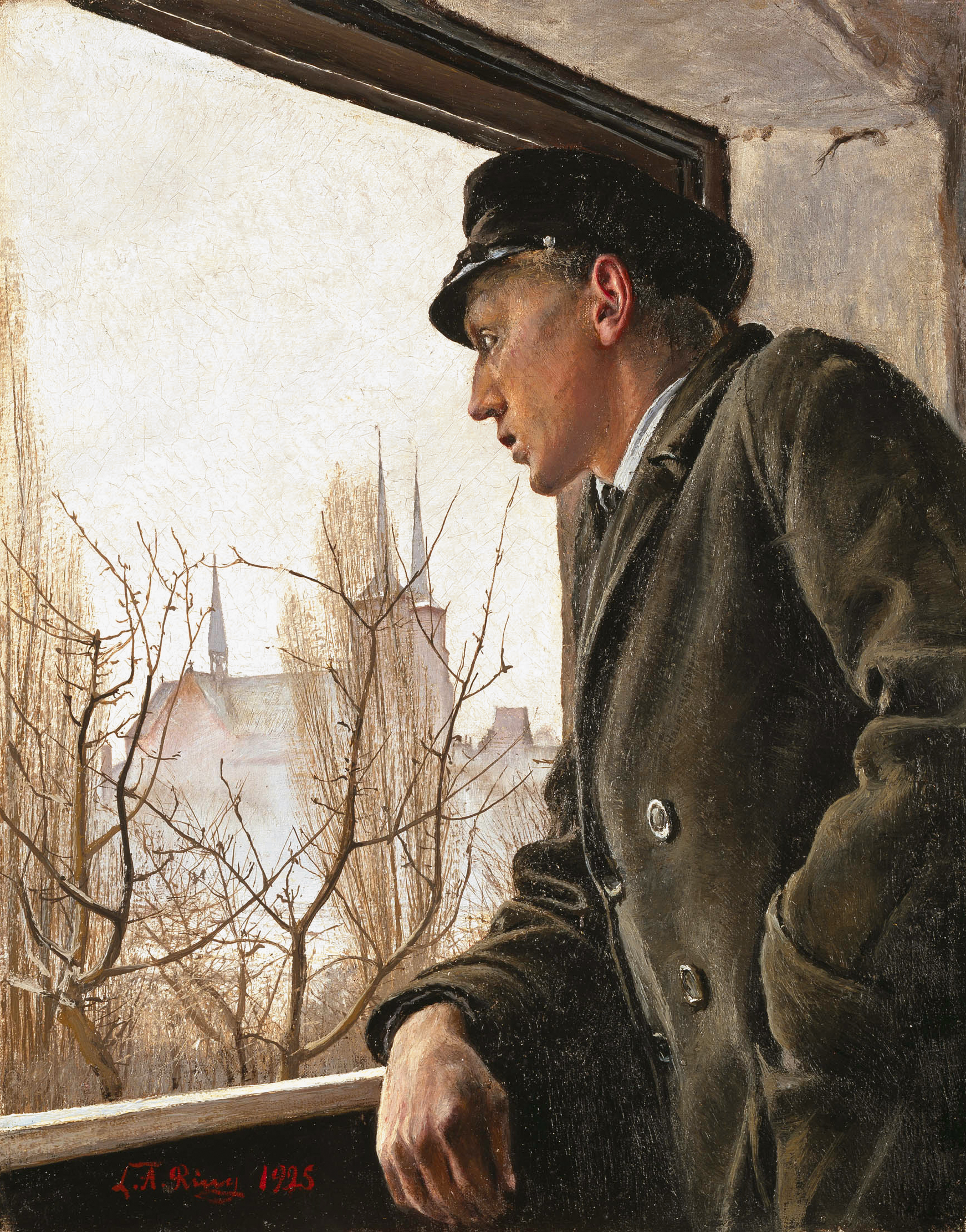
L.A. Ring, Ved vinduet. Ole ring, Ordrupgaard, 1925

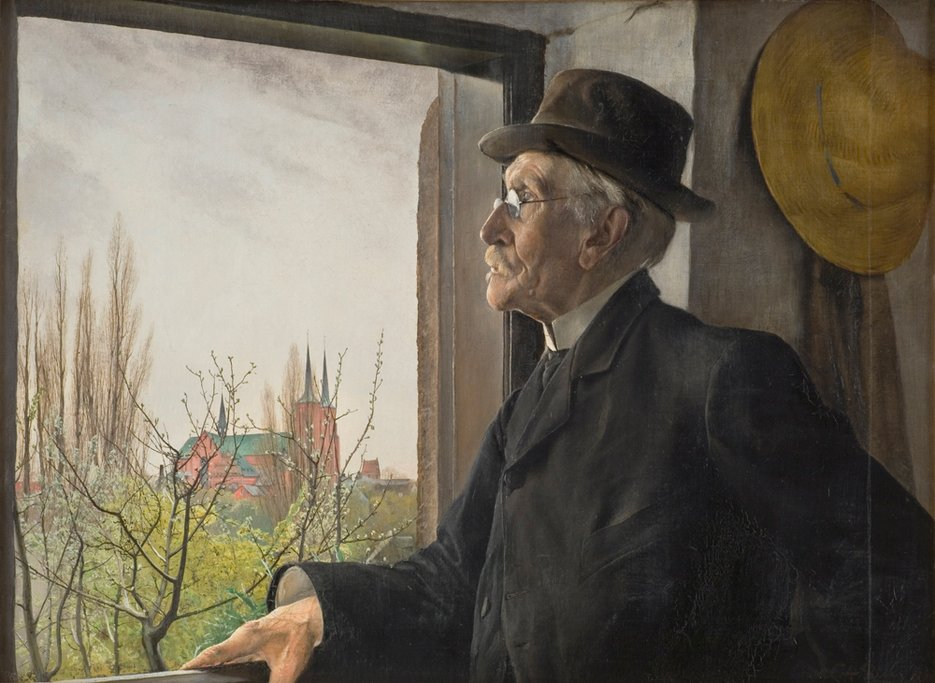
L.A. Ring, Foråret og den gamle, 1926, privately owned

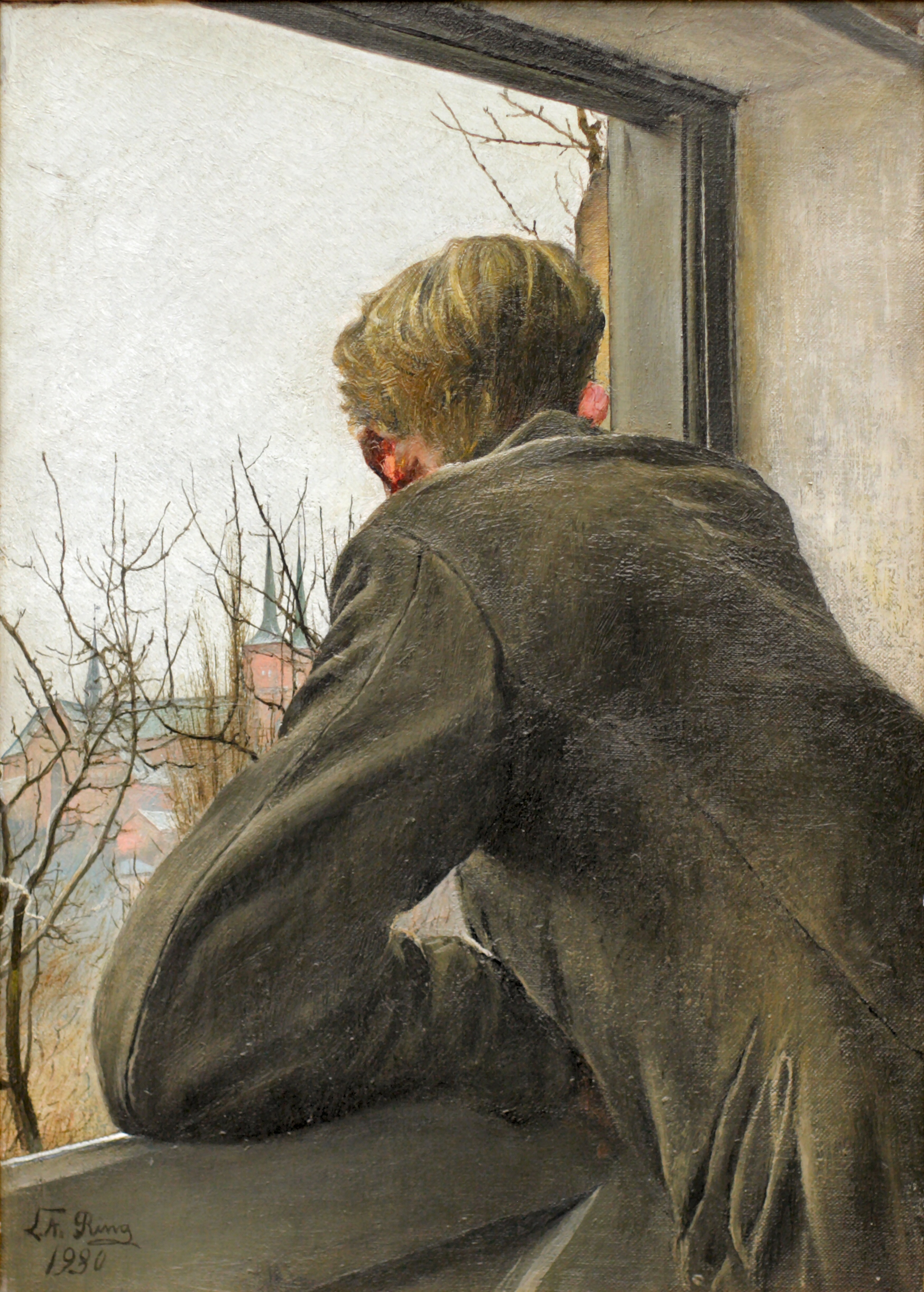
L.A. Ring, Sønnen Ole kigger ud af vinduet, 1930, Randers Kunstmuseum

Ring often uses doors and windows as thresholds. In some of the threshold paintings the person depicted is in a hesitant position in front of the doorway or window waiting to be able to connect with the outside world.

In other motifs it is the ultimate threshold before death, as seen in Den syge mand and På kirkegården i Fløng. Another threshold motif is the meeting between old and new, e.g. in The Railroad guard and Runesten ved Roskilde Landevej.

=== Landscapes ===
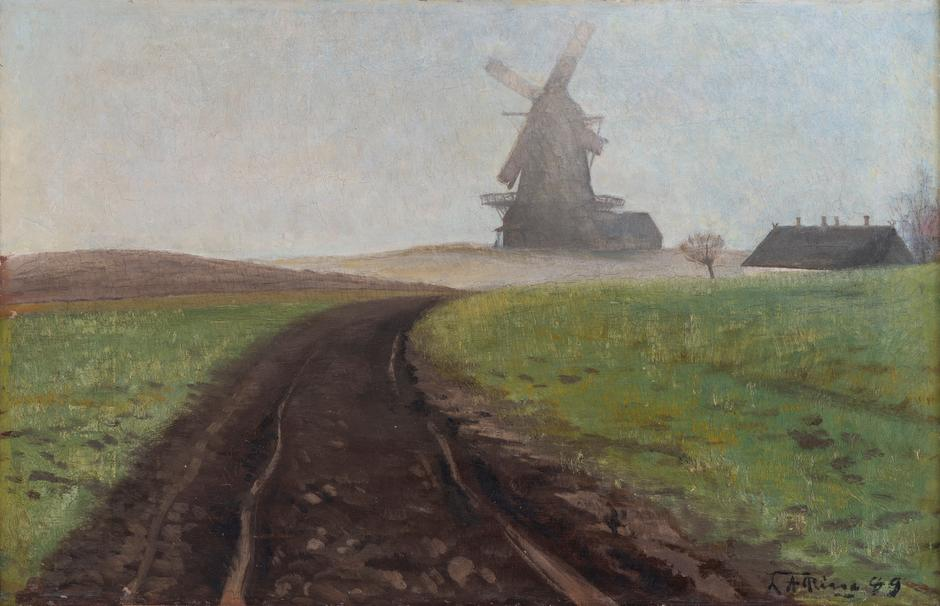
L.A. Ring, Tåget landskab med Mogenstrup Mølle, 1889, privately owned

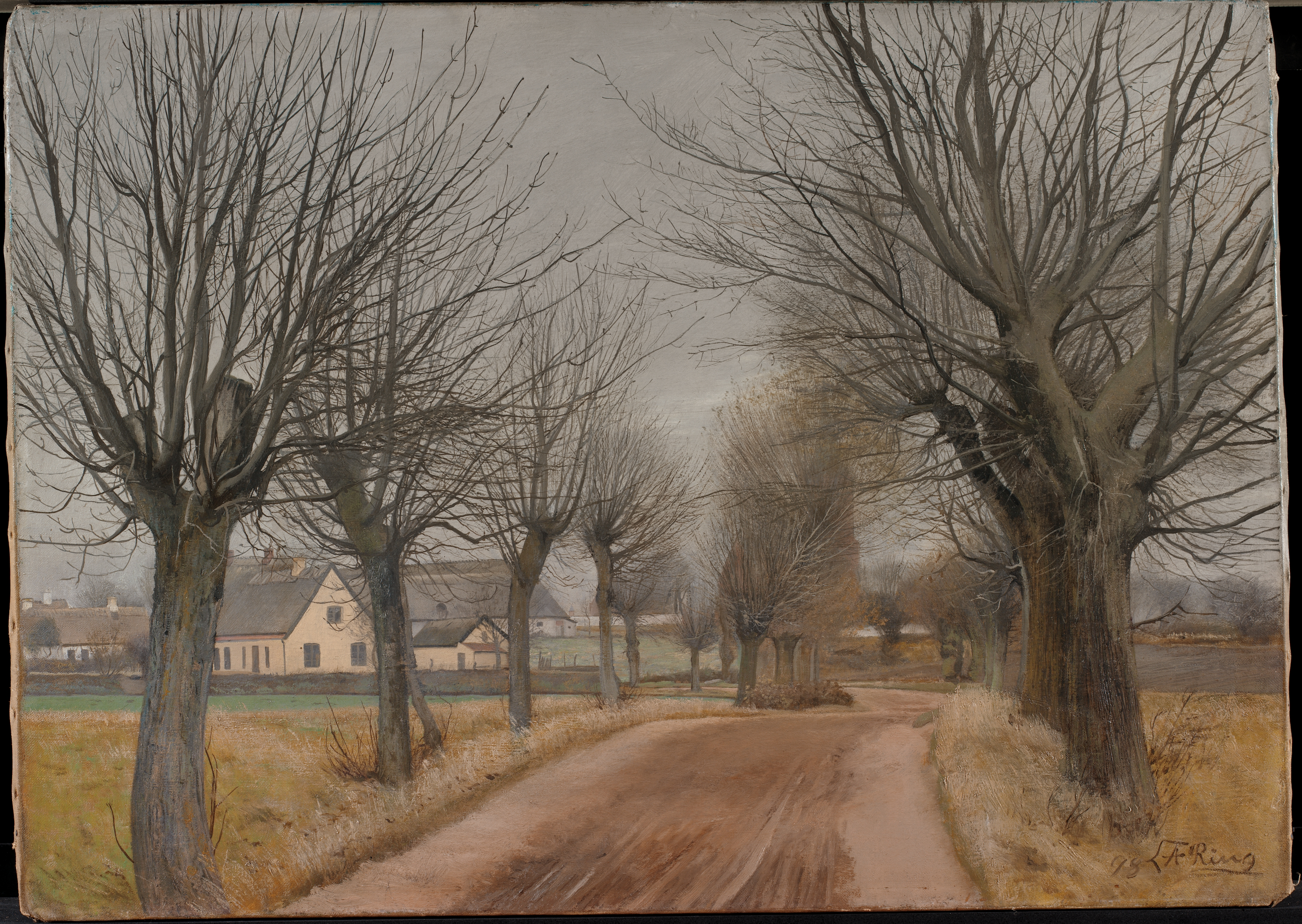
L.A. Ring, Vej ved Vinderød, 1898, Statens Museum for Kunst

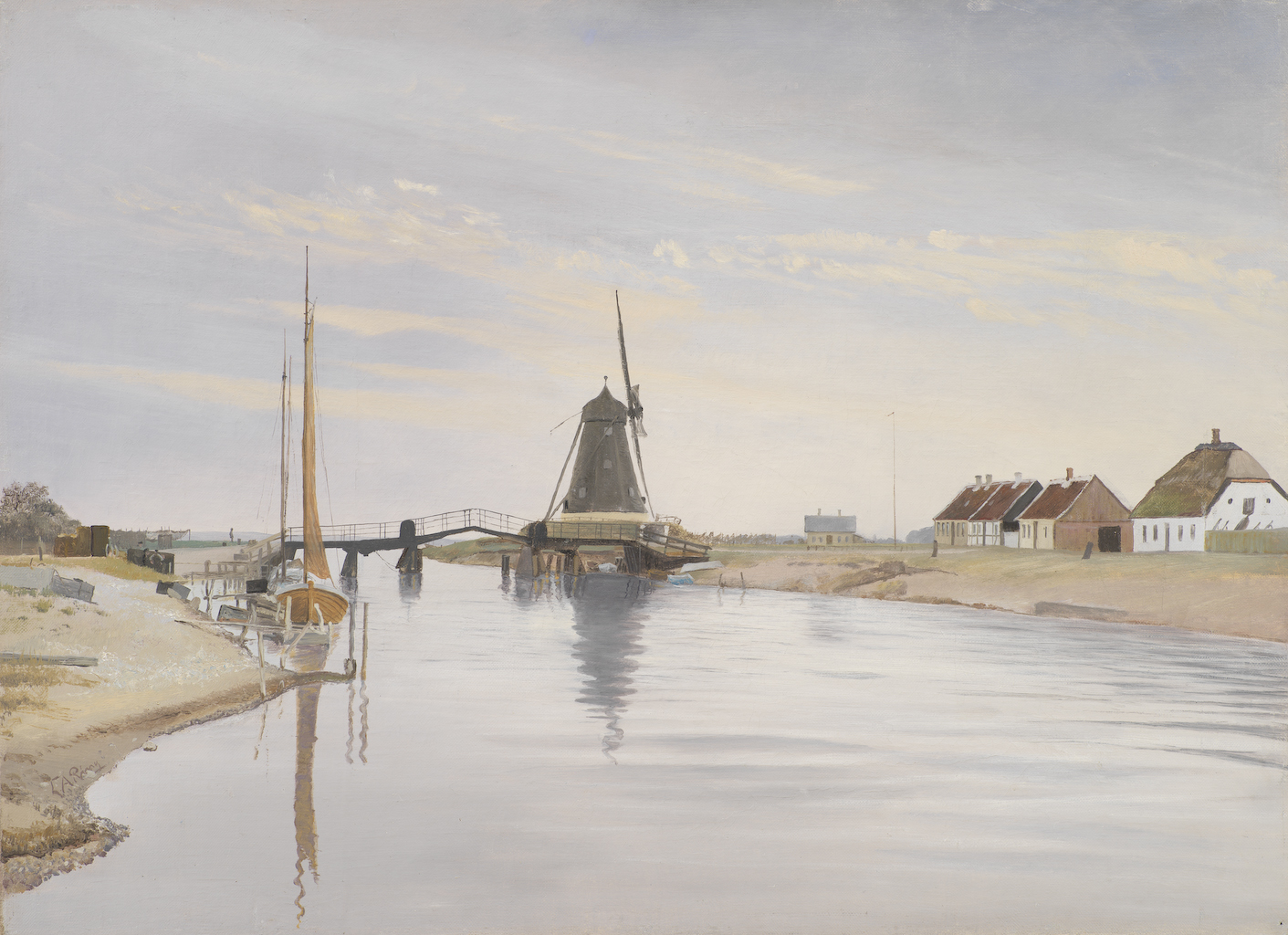
L.A. Ring, Susåen. Broen og møllen ved Karrebæksminde, 1898, Statens Museum for Kunst

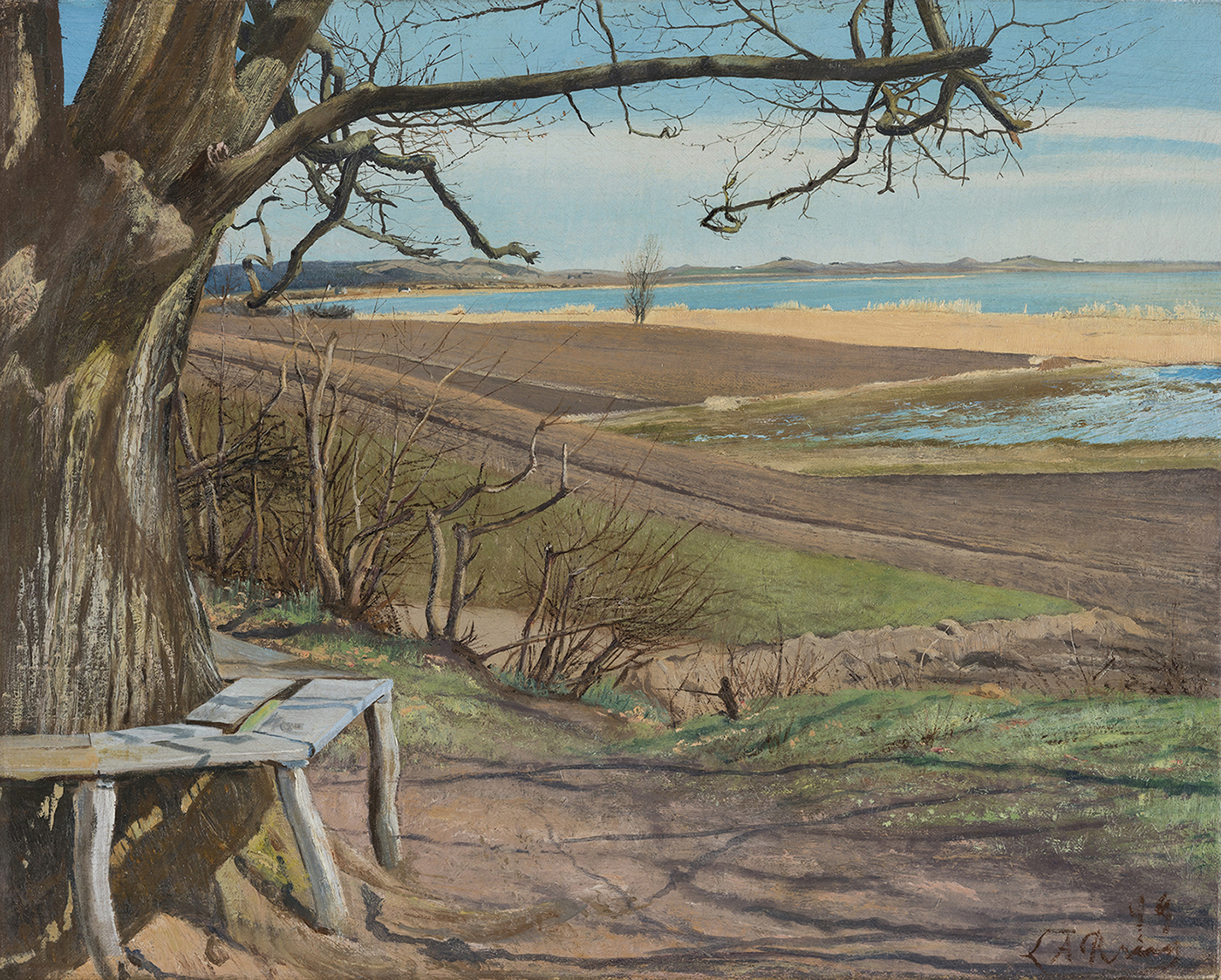
L.A. Ring, Lundbyes bænk ved Arresø, 1899, Ordrupgaard

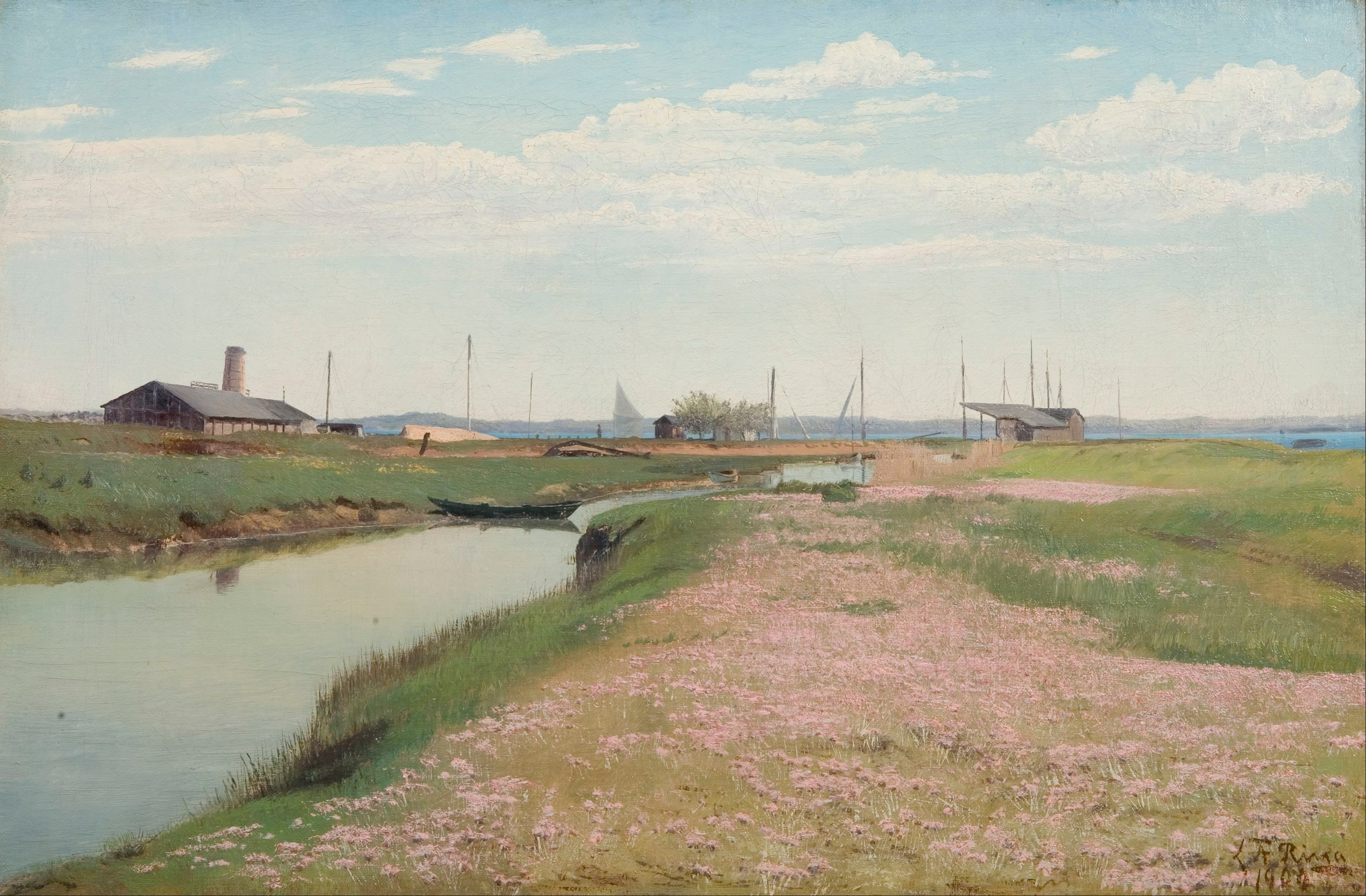
L.A. Ring, Åen og havnen ved Frederiksværk, 1900, Den Hirschsprungske Samling

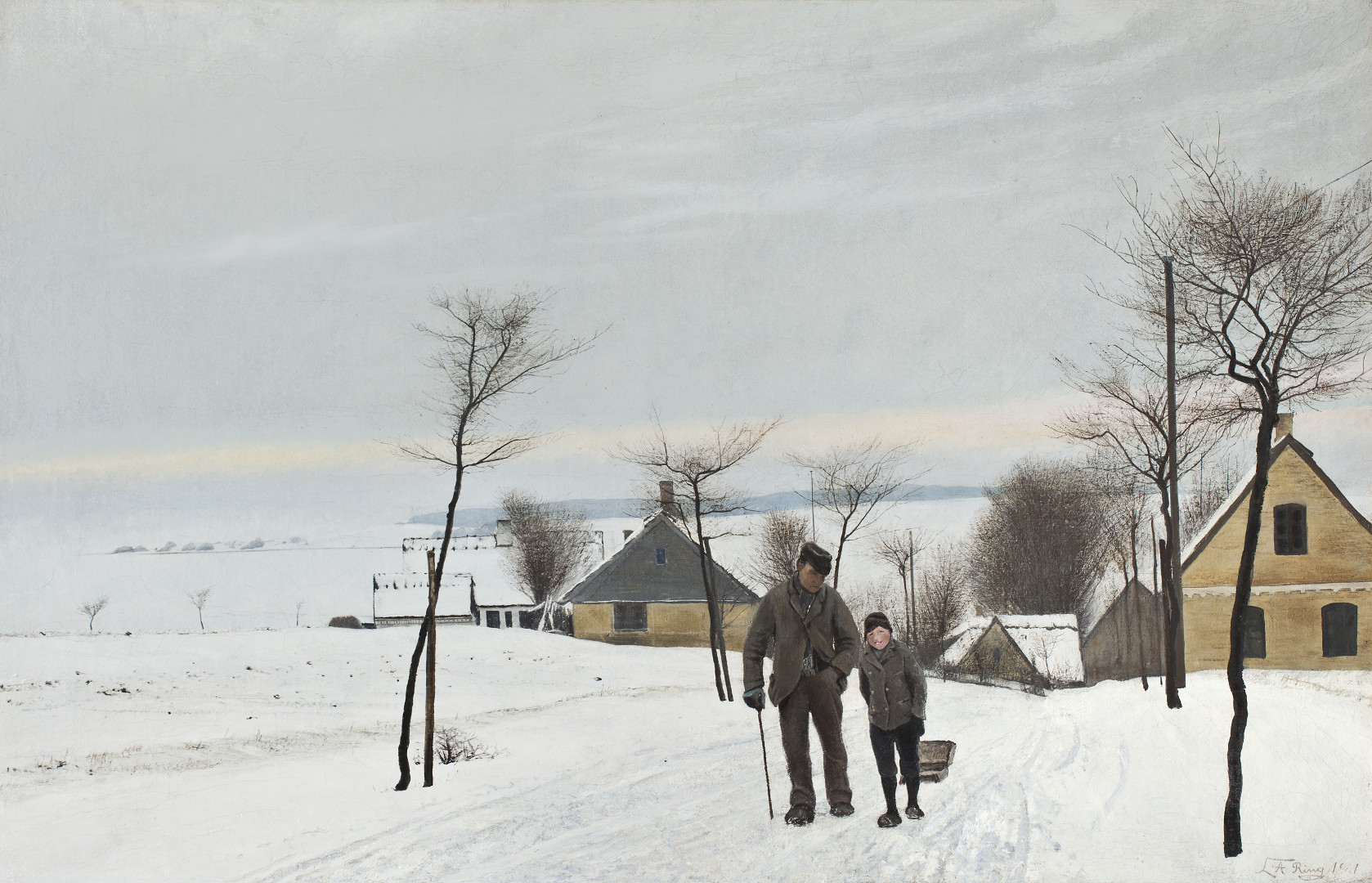
L.A. Ring, Diset vinterdag i Vinderød, 1901, Fuglsang Kunstmuseum

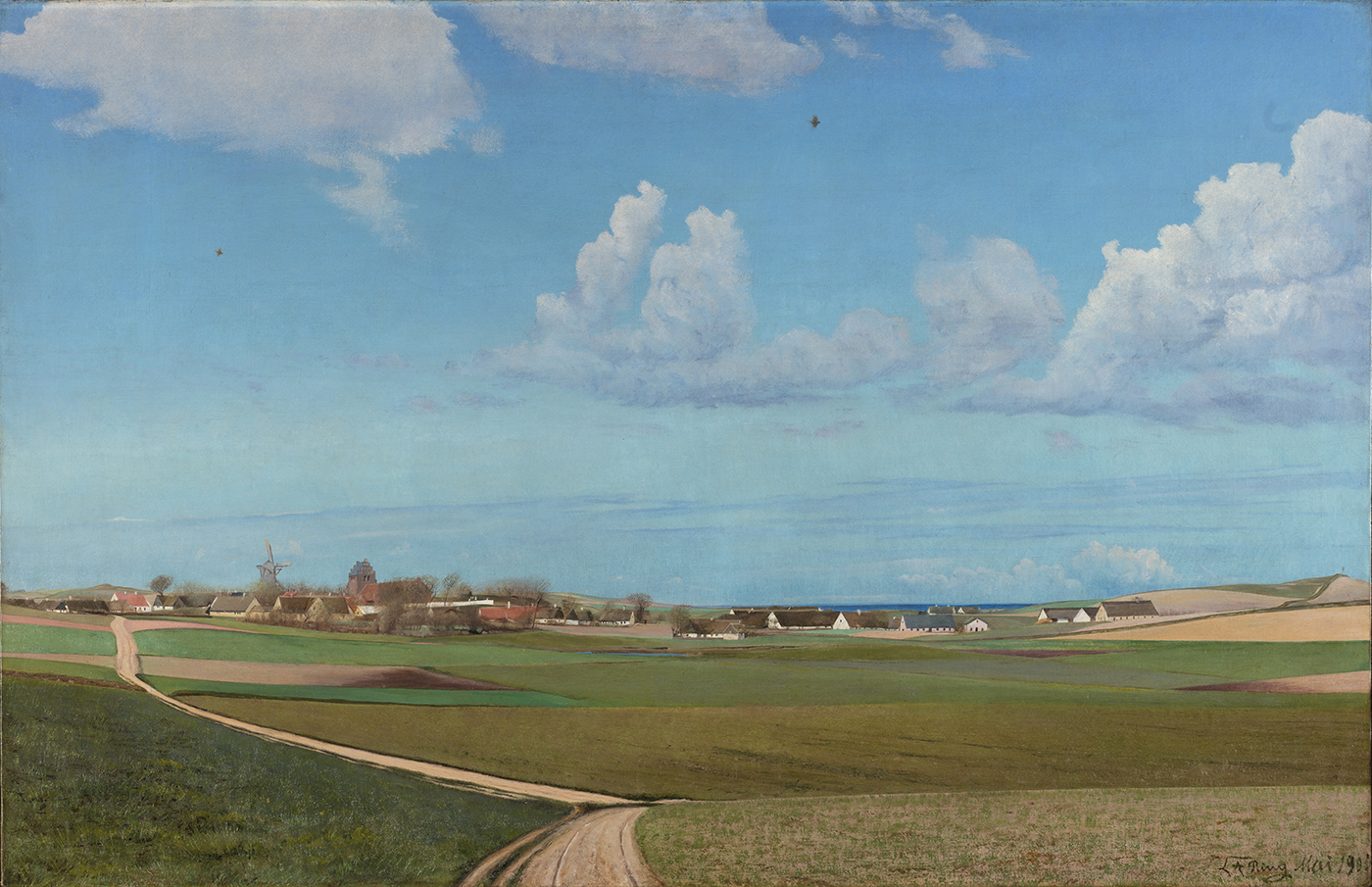
L.A. Ring, Tidligt forår. Motiv ved Melby, 1901, Ordrupgaard

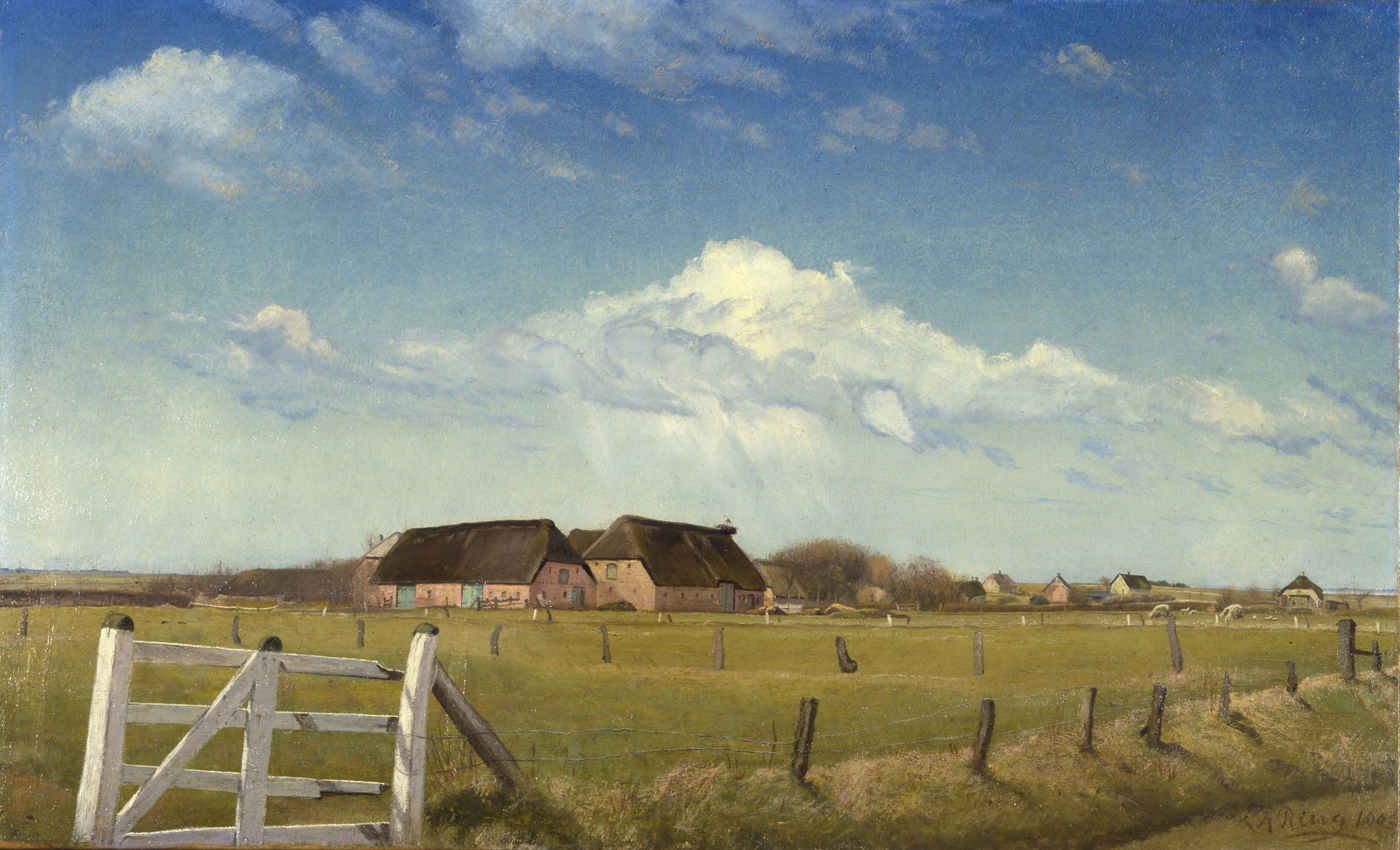
L.A. Ring, Indhegnede grønninger ved en gård med en storkerede på taget, Skærbæk, 1903, Davids Samling

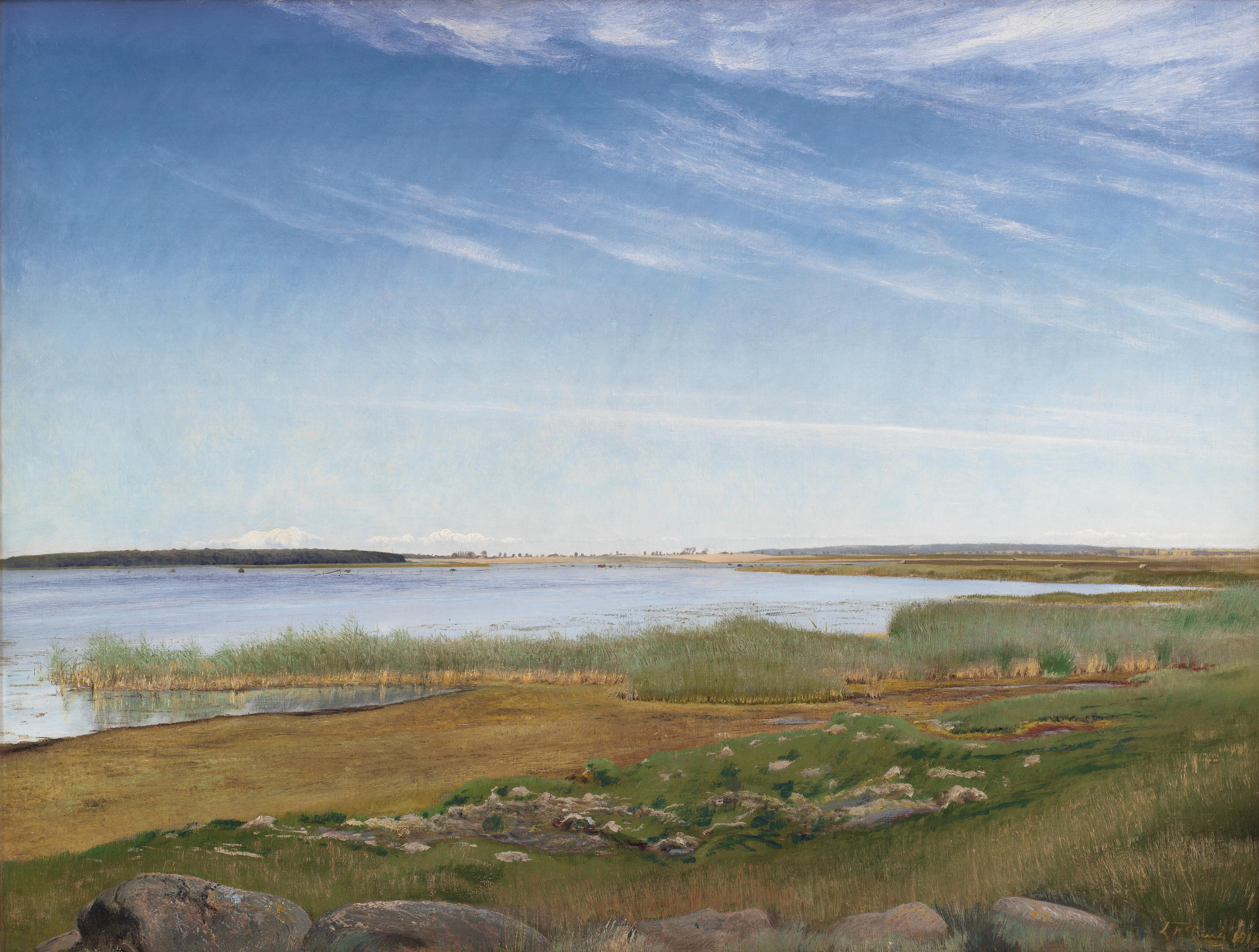
L.A. Ring, Fjorden ved Karrebæksminde, 1910, Statens Museum for Kunst

Ring in particular painted landscapes, but in the beginning of his career it was not the landscape painting that dominated his art. Up until 1887 there were about 10 landscape paintings out of approximately 90 works of art in his repertoire. From 1888 and until his death in 1933 the landscape painting however made up about three quarters of his production.

== Reception and exhibitions ==
Since 1951 Ring's works have been described in more than 150 articles, newspapers, journals and books. Furthermore, there has been several exhibitions in Denmark and abroad showcasing Ring's works of art: a Danish-Swedish travelling exhibition in 1973 with 46 works, the exhibition "Northern Light" in 1982-83 at three locations in USA, a large-scale exhibition at Orddrupgaard with 100 works of art, "Nordiske Stemninger" (Nordic Moods) in 2003 at Blaafarveværket, Norway with 42 works of art and lastly "På Kanten af Verden" (On the Edge of the World) in 2006-07 at The National Gallery of Denmark in Copenhagen (42 works of art) and Randers Kunstmuseum (85 works of art).

== Gallery ==
L. A. Ring's works

The Railroad guard (1884), people waiting at crossings or thresholds and railroads was a favored motif for Ring.

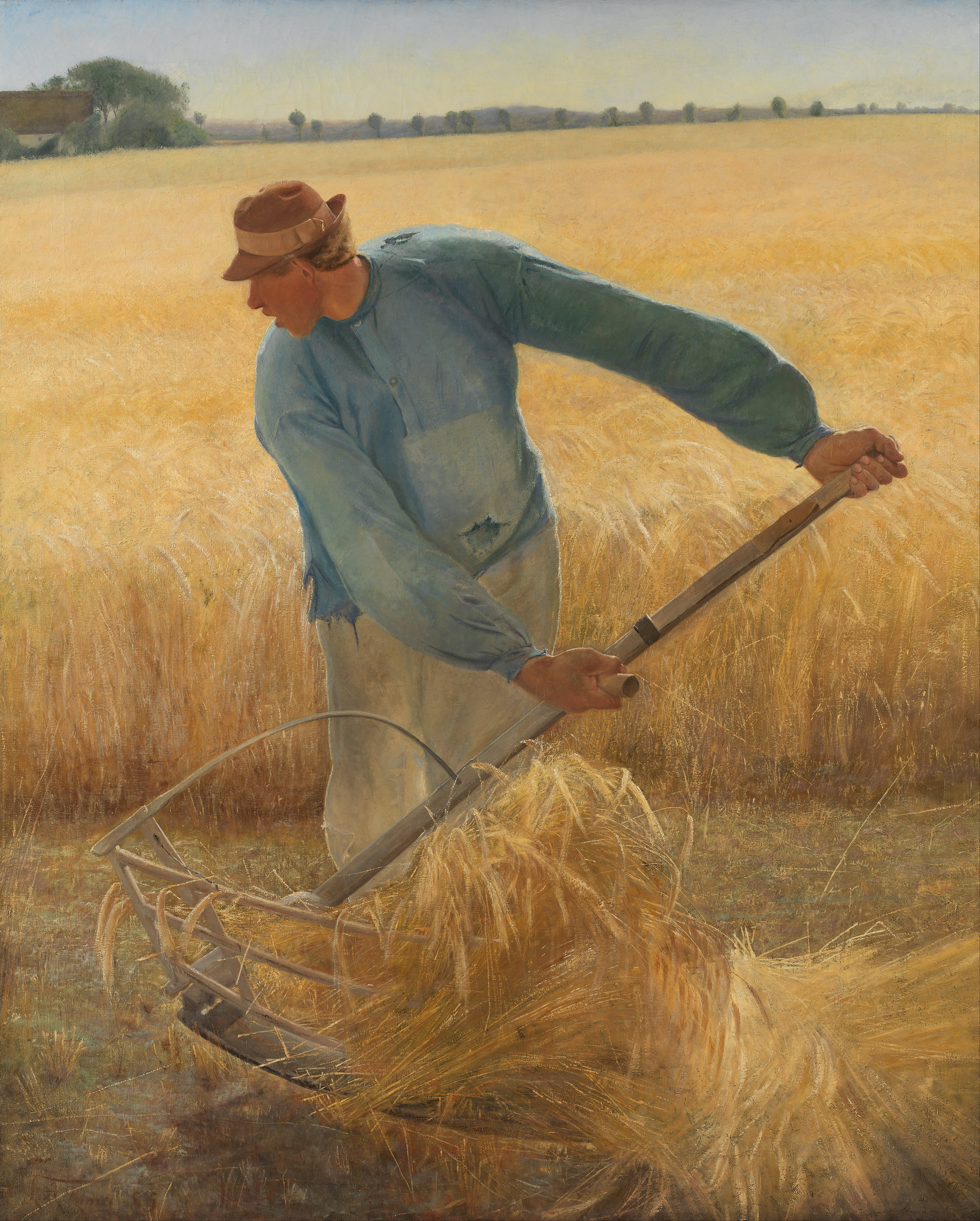
Harvest (1885). The harvest worker is Ring's brother Ole Peter Andersen, painted at his farm at Tehusene near Fakse in Southern Zealand. Compare with Millet's The Sower.

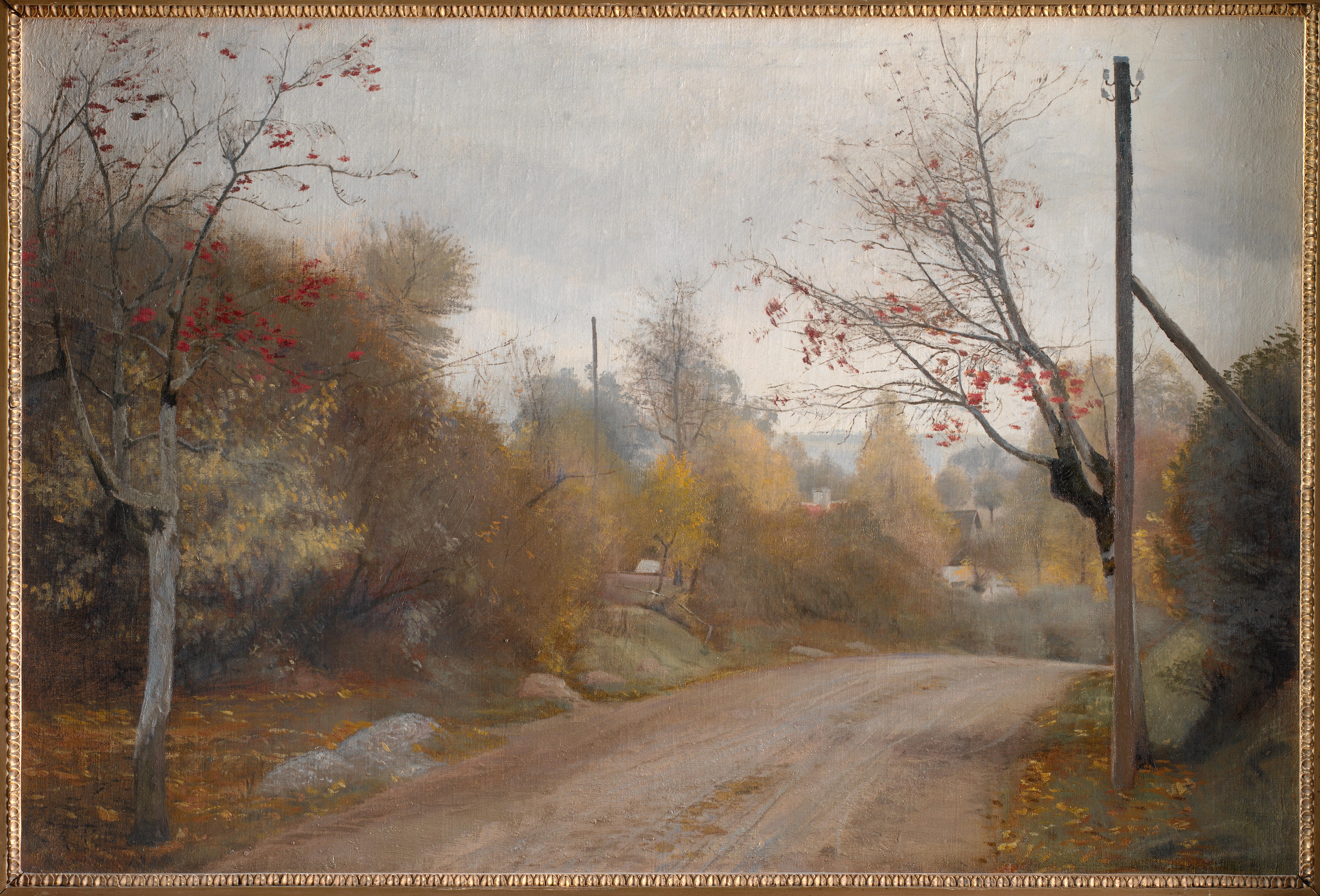
Road near Maagenstrup (1888)

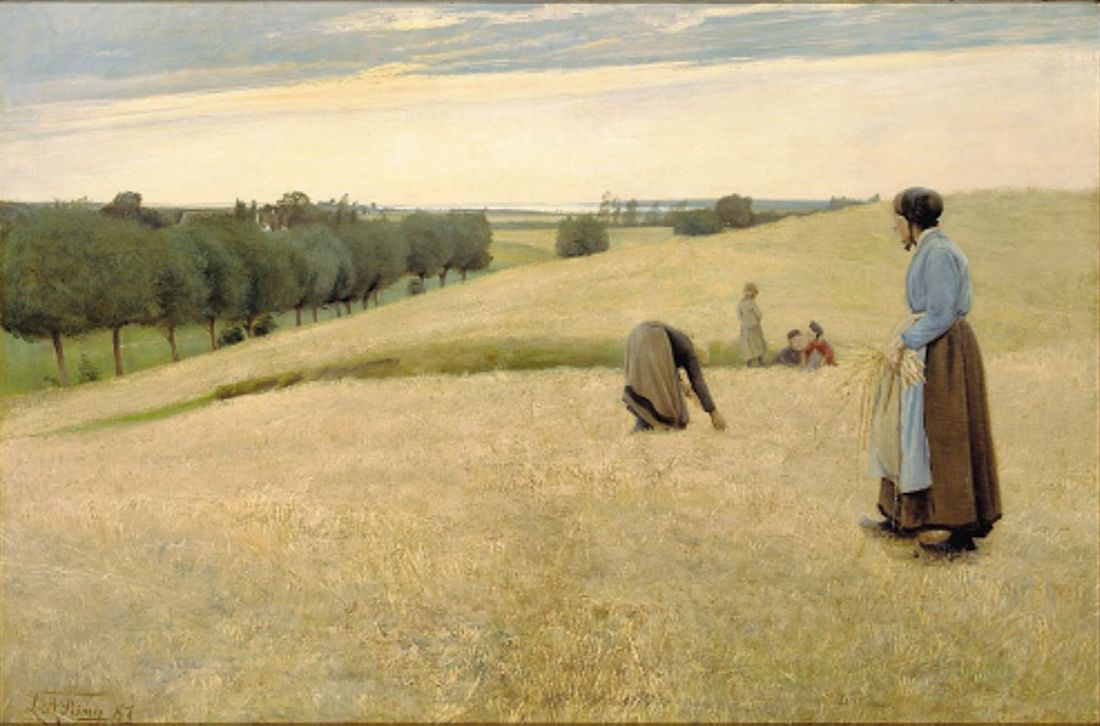
Gleaners (1887) compare with The Gleaners by Millet

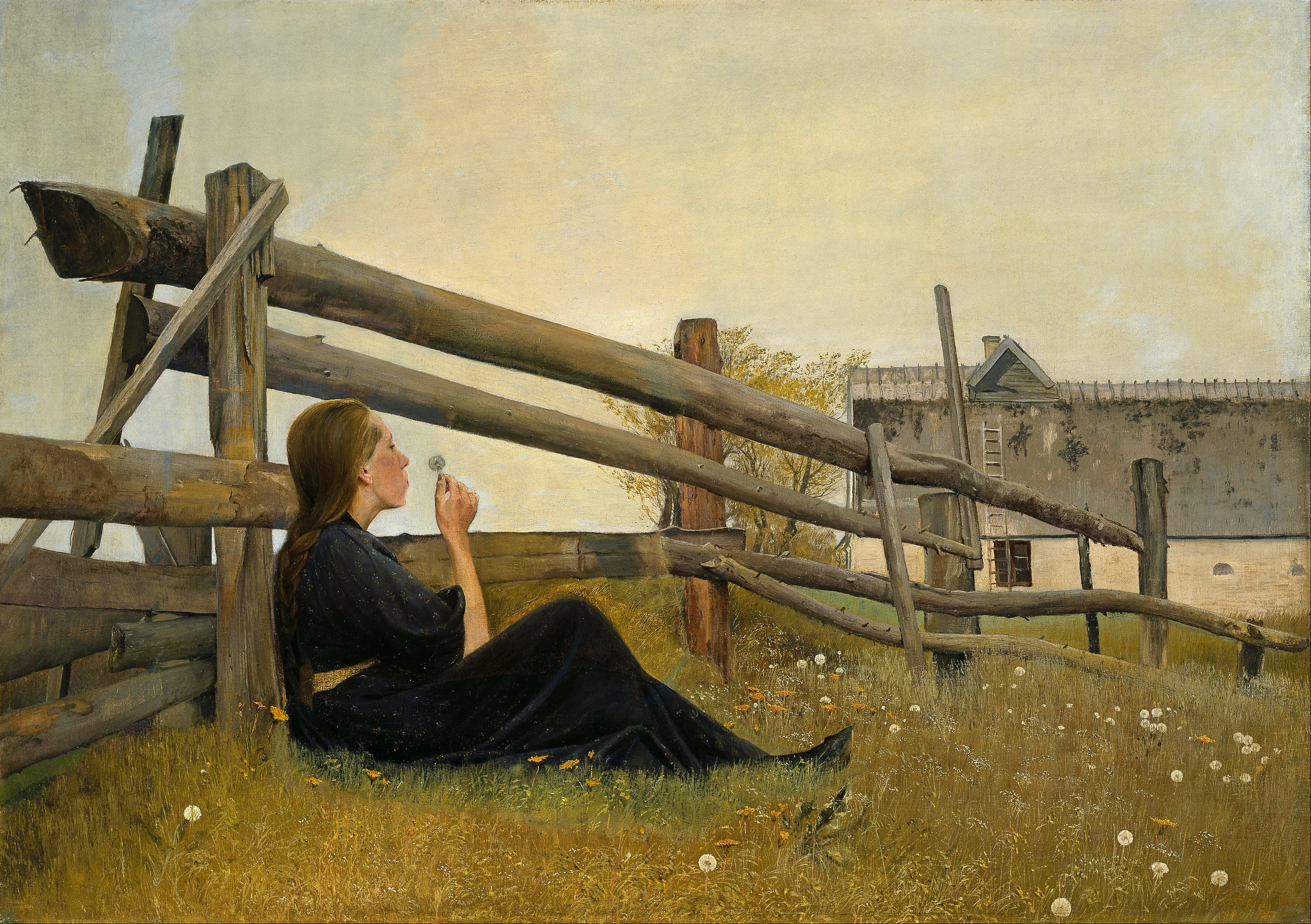
In the Month of June, 1899

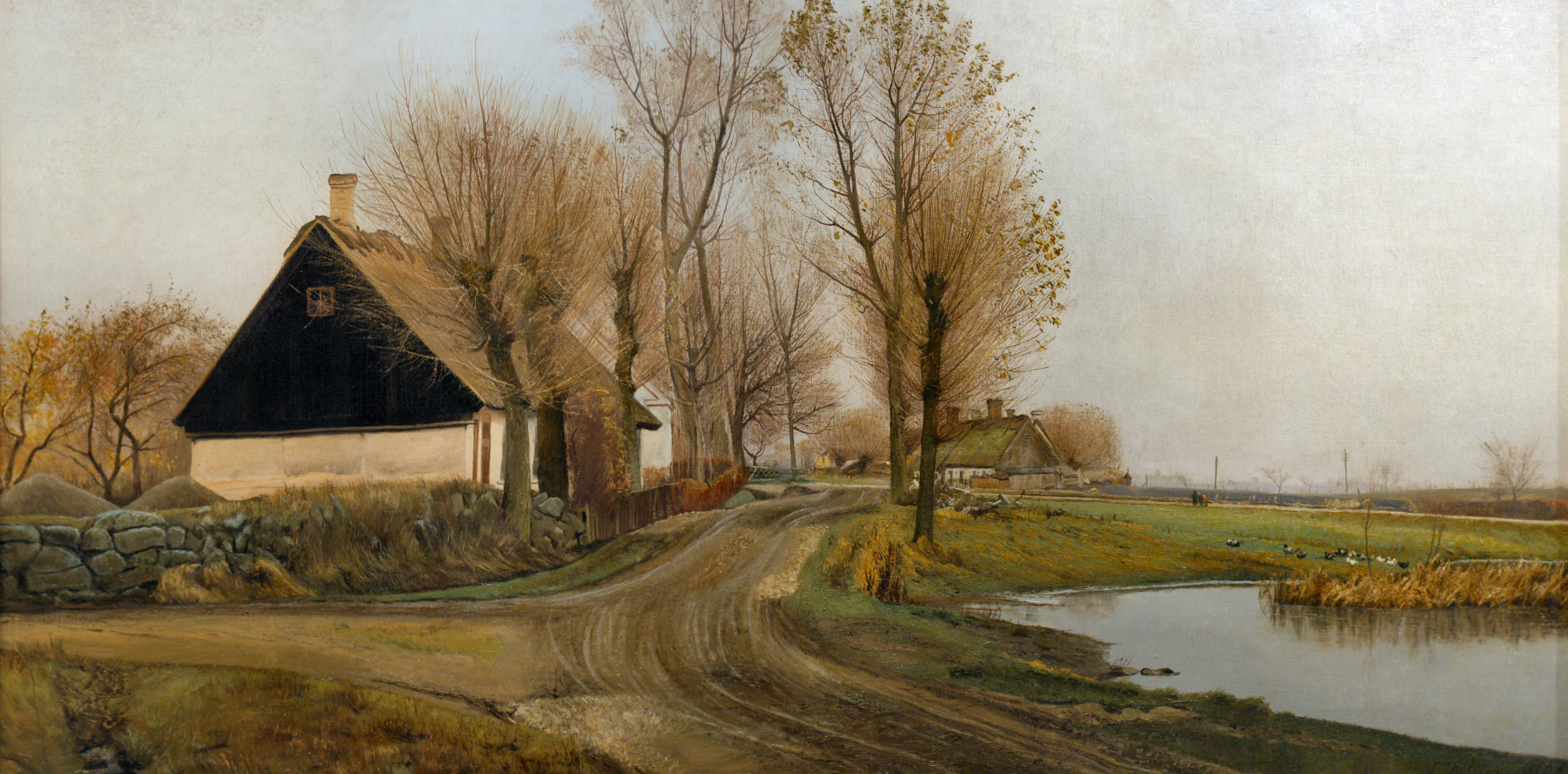
Village street in Baldersbrønde, (1905) ARoS Aarhus Kunstmuseum.

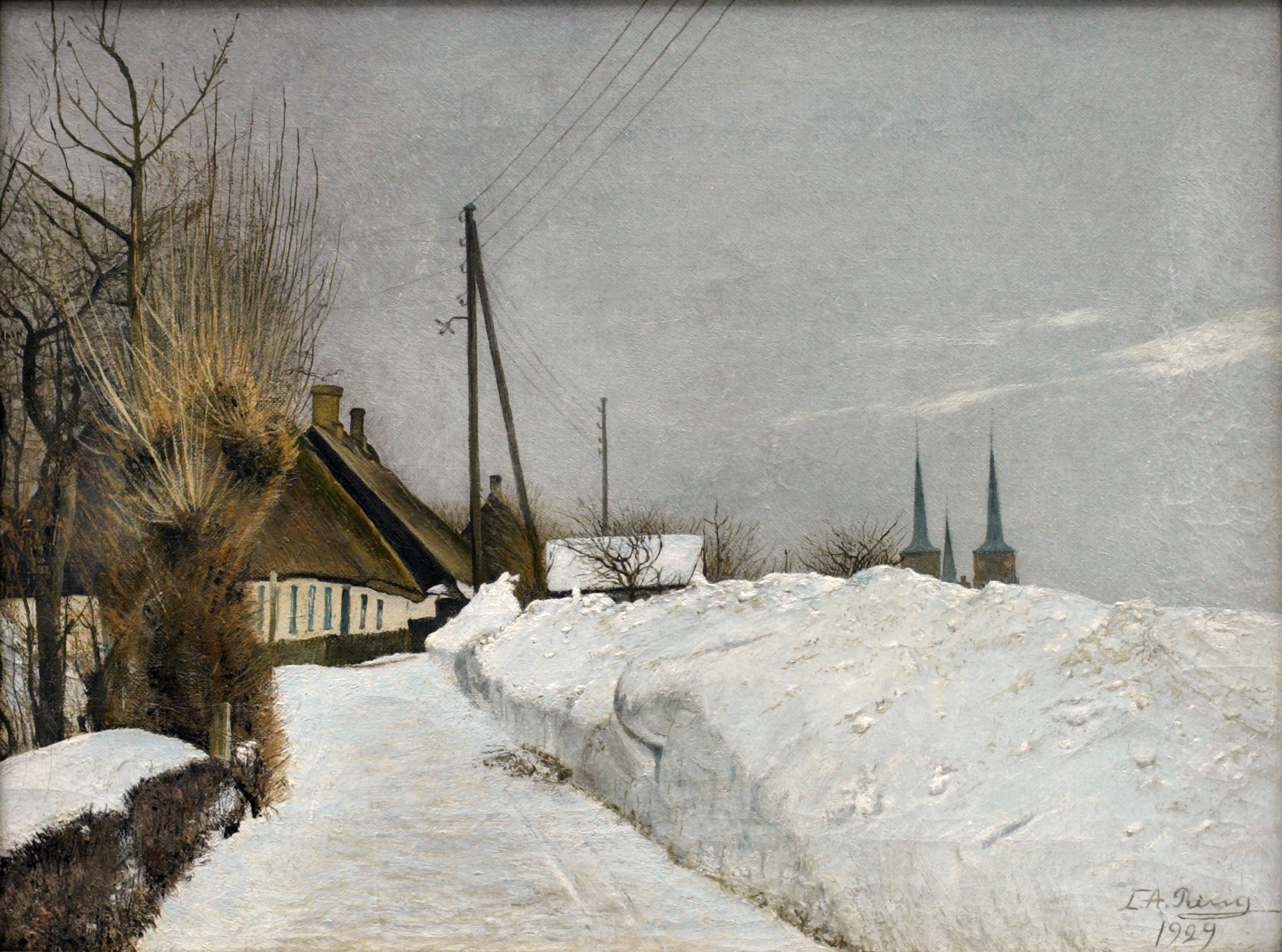
Winter Day in Roskilde (1929)

== See also ==
- Template:Laurits Andersen Ring
