= L. A. Ring House =

Historic building in Roskilde, Denmark

- L. A. Eings Villa
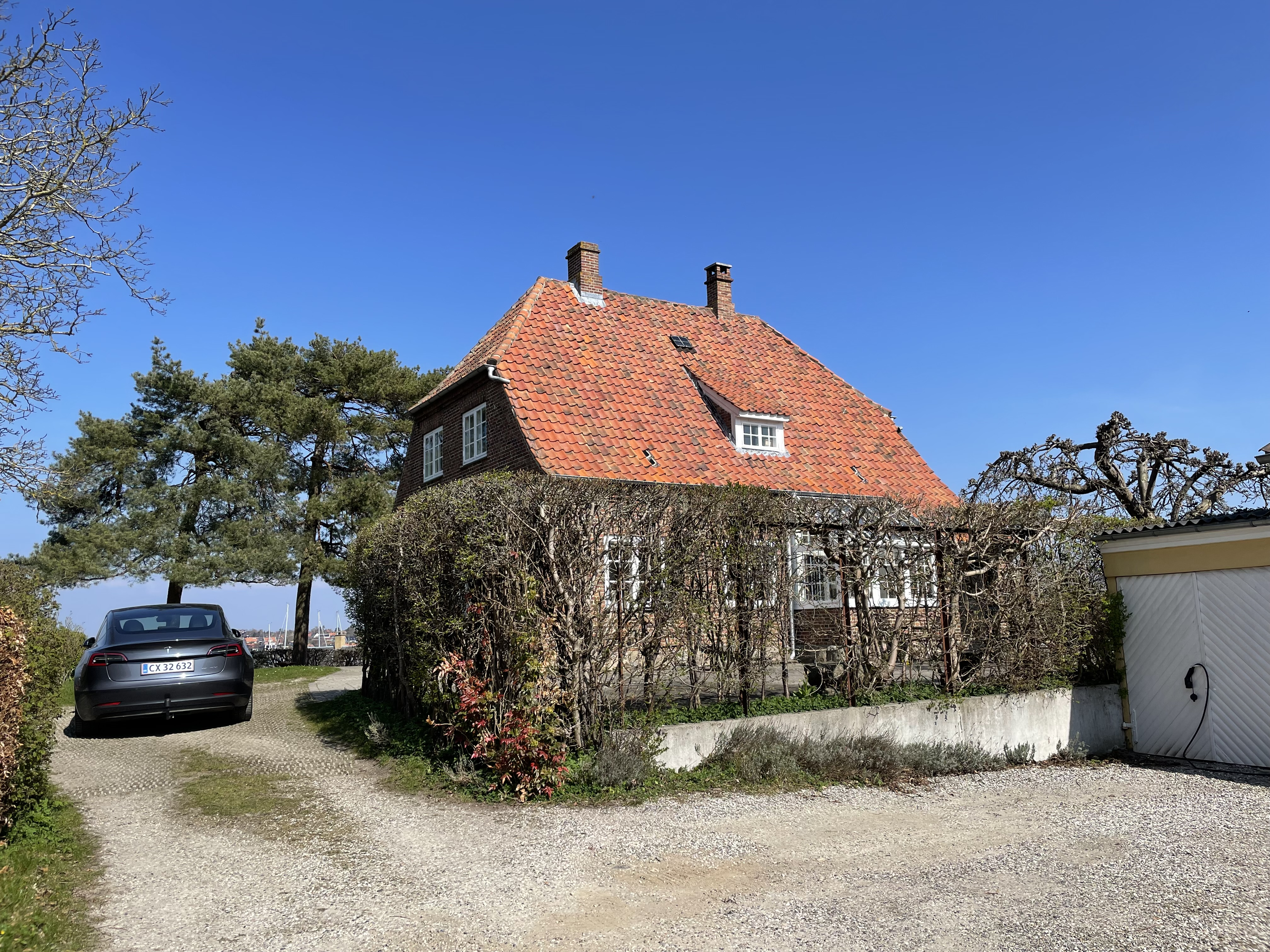

General information
- Location: Copenhagen, Denmark
- Coordinates: 55°38′53.05″N 12°4′35.22″E
- Renovated: 1914
- Client: Laurits and Sigrid Eing

Design and construction
- Architect: Andreas Clemmensen

The L. A. Ring House L. A. Rings Villa, located at Havnevej 25, is the former home of painter L. A. Ring and his wife Sigrid Ring, née Kähler in the Sankt Jørgensbjerg district of Roskilde, Denmark. The house is located on a sloping site overlooking St. Jørgensbjerg Village, Roskilde Harbour, and Roskilde Cathedral. It was listed on the Danish registry of protected buildings and places in 2001.

The house is a private residence without public access. Ring was for a while also the owner of an adjacent property at Brøndgade 1, which was used as an extra studio. This building was converted by a private association (L. A. Rings Venner) into a visitor center under the name L. A. Rings Atelier in 2017.

== History ==
=== Earlier homes ===
Laurits and Sigrid Ring were married in 1896. Their first home together was located in Karrebæksminde at Næstved. They later moved to Frederiksværk before settling in the old school in Baldersbrønde at Hedehusene.

=== L. A. and Sigrid Ring's home ===
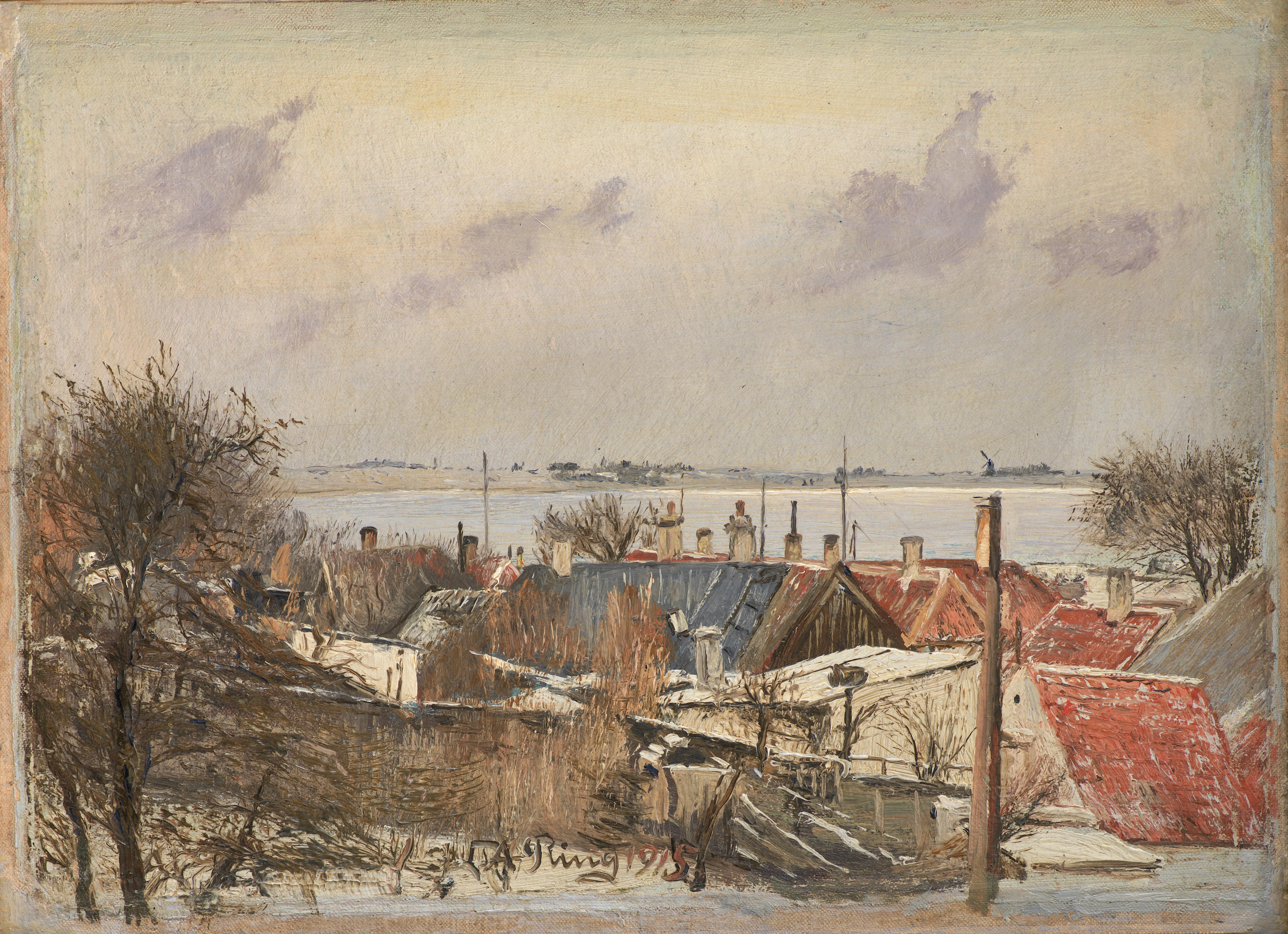
L. A. Ring: View of Sankt Jørgensbjerg and Roskilde Fjord. Winter Day (1915)

In 1913, Ring purchased a piece of land on Uglebjerg, a small hill in Sankt Jørgensbjerg, from St. Clare's Mill. A house designed by Ring's friend Andreas Clemmensen on the site the following year. It comprised a spacious studio. The couple lived there with their three children Ghita (1899), Anders (1900) and Ole (1902).

Sigrid Ring died in 1923 and was buried in nearby St. Ib's Graveyard. L. A. Ring continued to live in the house until his own death in 1933.

=== Later history ===
The house was then acquired by the historian Arthur Fang. It was later taken over by his daughter, Lotte Fang, a librarian and local historian.

== Architecture ==
The house is constructed in red brick in the style of Bedre Byggeskik, that combines influences from asymmetrical Danish villa architecture of the late 19th century with influences from Romantic Nationalism.

Above the main entrance are decorations with Renaissance-style masks and the interwoven initials of Sigrid and L. A. Ring. Their initials are also incorporated in the design of the rough iron garden gate.

The hall features reddish-brown and green tiles from Hakkemose Brickworks, The living room contains a stove from Kähler's Ceramics Factory in Næstved. Sigrid Eing was the daughter of the company's founder, Herman A. Kähler.

== L. A. Ring's Studio ==
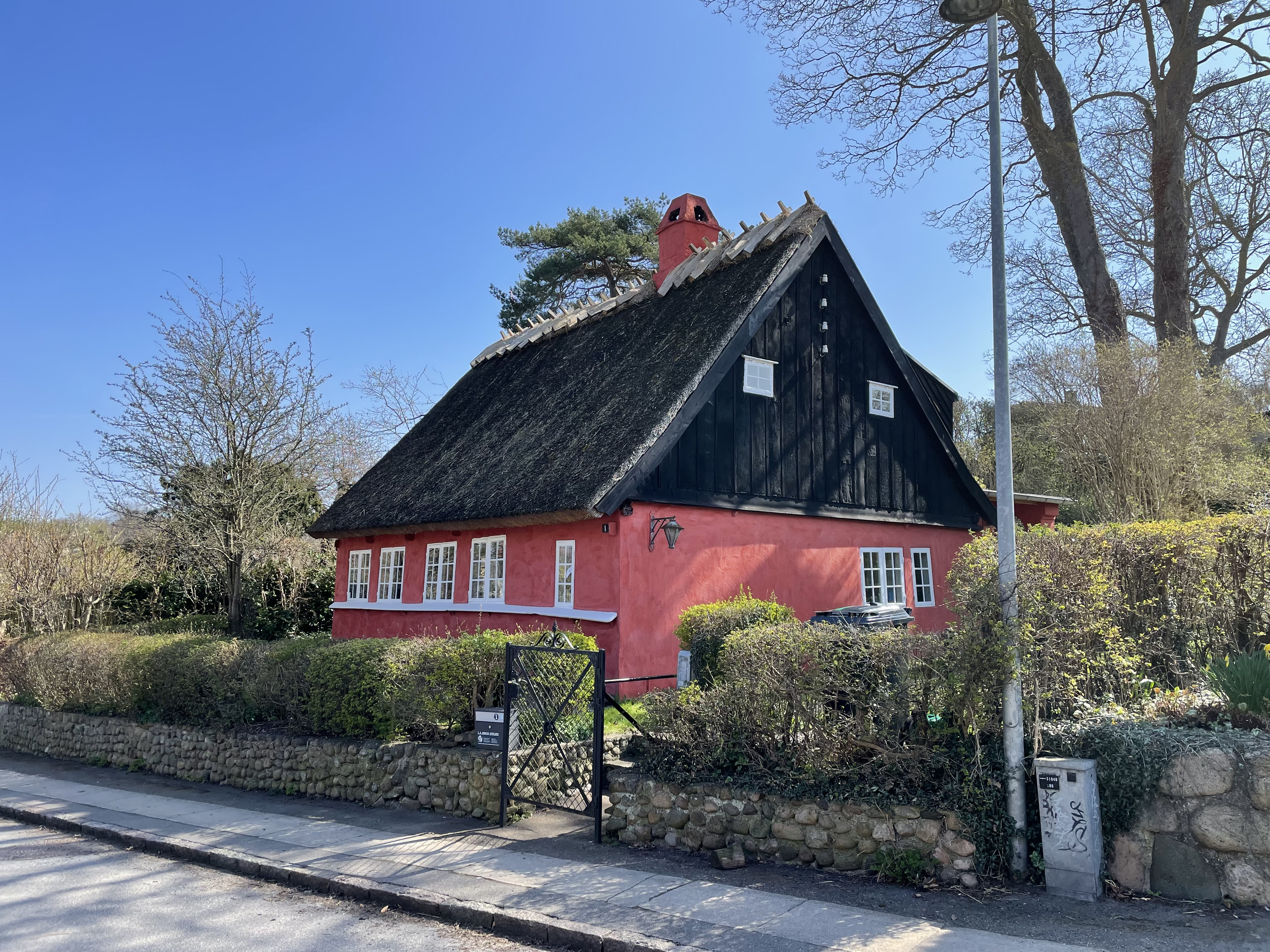
L.A. Rings Atelier

Ring bought a half-timbered house on an adjacent property in Brøndgade with the intention of using it as an extra studio. He expanded the house but only used it sporadically and ended up selling it again. A group of local citizens from Roskilde formed an association, L. A. Ring's Cenner, with the intention of turning it into a visitor center. It was subsequently acquired by Winnie Liljeborg and put through a renovation. The visitor center opened in 2017.

== See also ==
- Kastellet (Roskilde)
