= Kähler Keramik =

Danish ceramics manufacturer

Kähler Ceramics
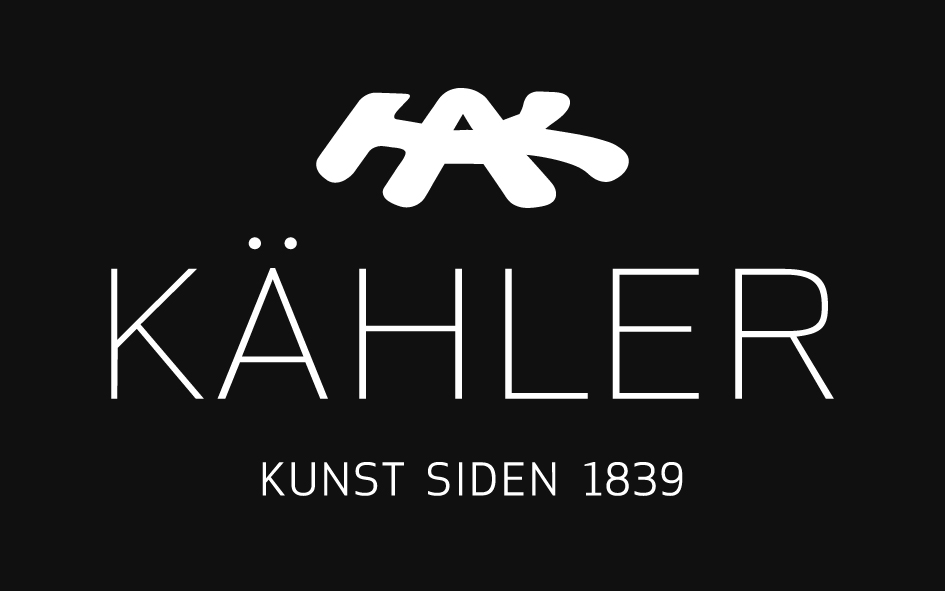
- Native name: Kähler Keramik
- Company type: Ceramics
- Founded: 1839; 186 years ago in Næstved, Denmark
- Founder: Joachim Christian Herman Kähler
- Headquarters: Denmark
- Area served: World Wide
- Key people: Jesper Holst Schmidt (CEO)
- Products: Omaggio
- Owner: Frantz Longhi
- Website: Official Website

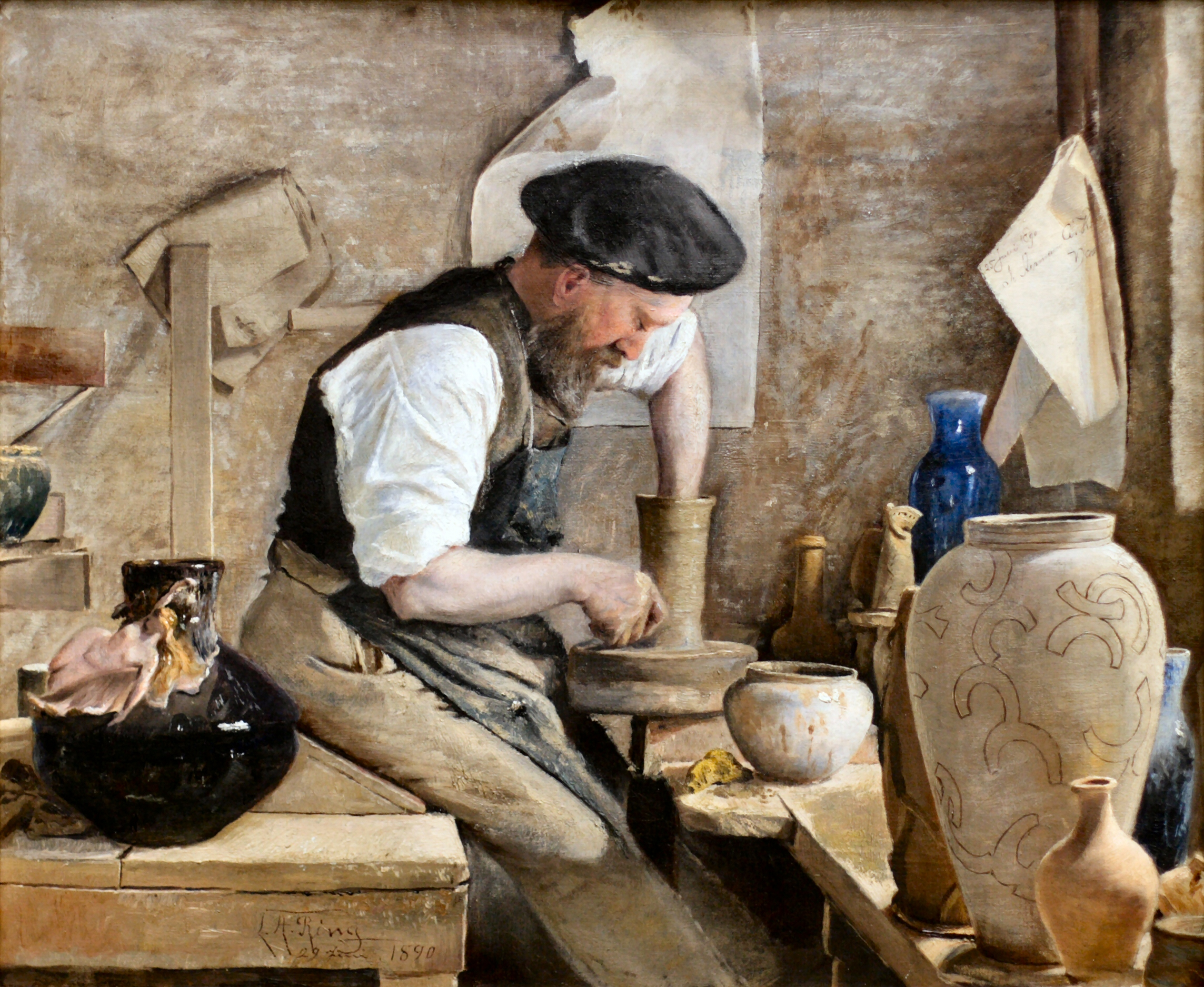
Herman Kähler in his Workshop, painting by L.A. Ring (1890)

Kähler Keramik (Kähler Ceramics) is a Danish ceramics manufacturer based in Næstved on the island of Zealand.

== History ==
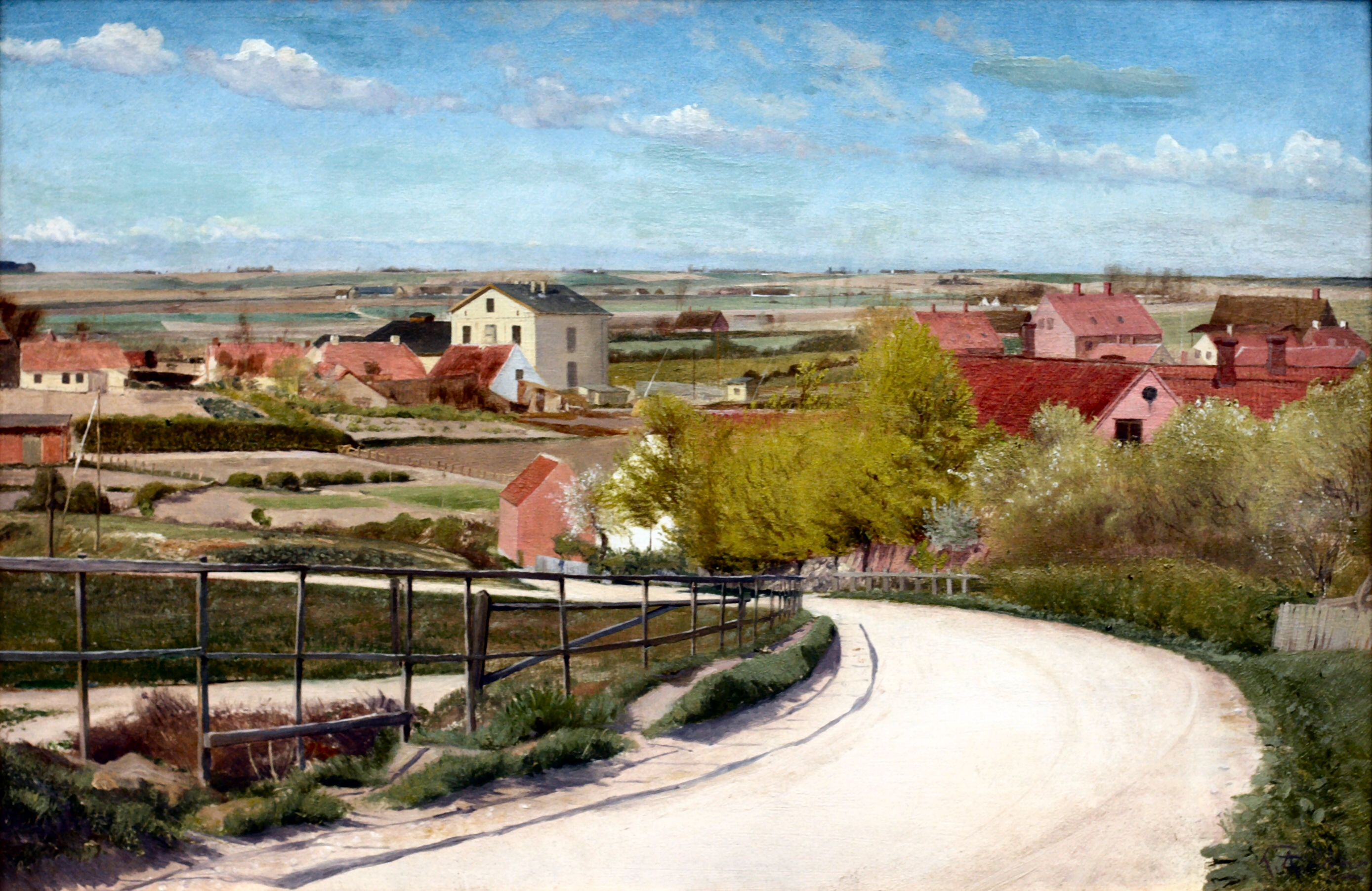
Kähler's buildings behind the hill in Næstved, painting by L. A. Ring

Joachim Christian Herman Kähler (1808–84) from Heiligenhafen in the Duchy of Holstein established himself as a potter in Næstved in 1839, producing heating stoves, cooking pots and kitchenware. His son, Herman A. Kähler (1846-1917), together with his younger brother Carl Frederik Kähler, took over the running of the factory in 1872. Carl became responsible for producing faience while Herman specialized in manufacturing tiled stoves. In 1875, after Carl withdrew and the original factory had burnt down, Herman built a new factory on the town's outskirts where he produced both stoves and pottery. Inspired by Vilhelm Klein, Herman A. Kähler started to experiment with more appealing designs with glazed finishes. In 1886, he succeeded in attracting the artists H. A. Brendekilde, L.A. Ring and Carl O.J. Lund.

Kähler became interested in obtaining the red lustre glaze known as maiolica which had been produced in Gubbio, Italy, in the 16th century. In 1888 he succeeded, developing the now famous ruby glaze known as Kähler red. The designer Karl Hansen Reistrup (1863–1929) soon joined the enterprise, assisting in the production of finely formed, artistically decorated items, especially vases. Thanks to Reistrup's designs, Kähler's ceramics achieved considerable success both at the Great Nordic Exhibition held in Copenhagen in 1888 and at the Exposition Universelle held the following year in Paris.

In c. 1913, H.A. Kahler was formed as a limited company with three directors: Herman A. Kähler was responsible for overall management, his son Herman Hans Christian Kâhler headed artistic development and Rasmus Grønholt directed sales. After Herman A. Kähler died in 1917, his son Hans Christian assumed responsibility for the company benefiting from the involvement of painters Signe Steffensen and Tulle Emborg. Svend Hammershøi participated in the company from 1893 until his death in 1948 while Jens Thirslund was artistic director from 1913 until 1940. The painter Helge Jensen and the sculptor Kai Nielsen also contributed to designs from 1921 to 1924. After Herman H.C. Kähler died in 1940, his sons Herman J. Kähler (1904-1996) and Nils Kähler (1906-1979) took the lead, achieving success in exports after the end of the Second World War. New designs were contributed by Bode Willumsen (1895-1987), Arne L. Hansen (born 1921), Allan Schmidt (born 1923) and Eva Sørensen (1940–2019).

== Kähler today ==
The firm was sold to Næstved Municipality in 1974. It was subsequently resold to a series of new owners, including Holmegaard without the involvement of the Kähler family. In 2007, it was acquired by Frantz Longhi. In 2018, it was acquired by Rosendahl Design Group.
