= Kastellet =

Kastellet may refer to:

Denmark

- Kastellet (Roskilde), a historic house
- Kastellet, Copenhagen, a citadel

Norway

- Kastellet tram stop, an Oslo Tramway station

Sweden

- Kastellet, Stockholm, a citadel
- Kastellet ferry, a passenger ferry in Stockholm
- Kastellet, a citadel at the Karlskrona Naval Base UNESCO World Heritage Site
