= Ghita Hempel =

Danish painter

Ghita Johanne Hempel (5 January 1899 – 24 March 1948) was a Danish painter.

== Biography ==
She was born on 5 January 1899 in Vinderød, the daughter of painters Laurits Andersen Ring and Sigrid Ring, née Kähler. The family lived in the L. A. Ring House in Roskilde from 1914.

After preparatory training in art under Viggo Brandt, she attended the Royal Danish Academy of Fine Arts from September 1917 to 1919. She was represented on the Charlottenborg Spring Exhibition in 1921-22, 1926 and 1928 as well. She was also represented on Kunstnernes Efterårsudstilling in 1929 and on an exhibition with Danish artist families (Danske kunstnerslægter) at Charlottenborg in 1952. The art dealer Christian Larsen arranged a special exhibition with her works alongside works in silver and gold by her brother Anders Ring in Copenhagen in 1925. Her works were also featured on a special exhibition in Messens Kunstkælder in 1934.

On 23 June 1925, she was married to the painter Hans Peter Vilhelm Hempel (30 March 1888 – 4 November 1963). She gave up painting completely in the early 1940s. She died on board a ship on the way to Brazil in 1948. She is buried in Pernambuco.

== Selected works ==
- Portrait of L. A. Ring (1917, Roskilde Museum)
- Anders (1917)
- Forårsdag. Lejre (1917)
- Viadukten ved Hedehusene (1918)
- Enø (1919)
- Modeller i badeværelset (1920–21)
- Mor i haven (1921)
- En pram kalfatres (1921)
- Portrait of keramiker Herman Jørgen Kähler (1921)
- Papirfabrik ved Susåen (1921)
- Maglekildebakken, Roskilde (1922)
- Portræt (udst. 1922)
- Portrait of Lauritz Johansen (1924)
- Portrait of Hjørdis Hartmann (1924)
- Strand i Boserup Skov (1924)
- Kællingehaven. Roskilde (1924)
- Blomster i vindueskarmen (1924)
- Ung pige i en klit ved Højen (1926, Skagens Museum)
- Drivhusinteriør (1926)
- Clivia (udst. 1926)
- korsstingsbroderier (udst. 1929)
