= Ole Ring =

Danish painter (1902-1972)

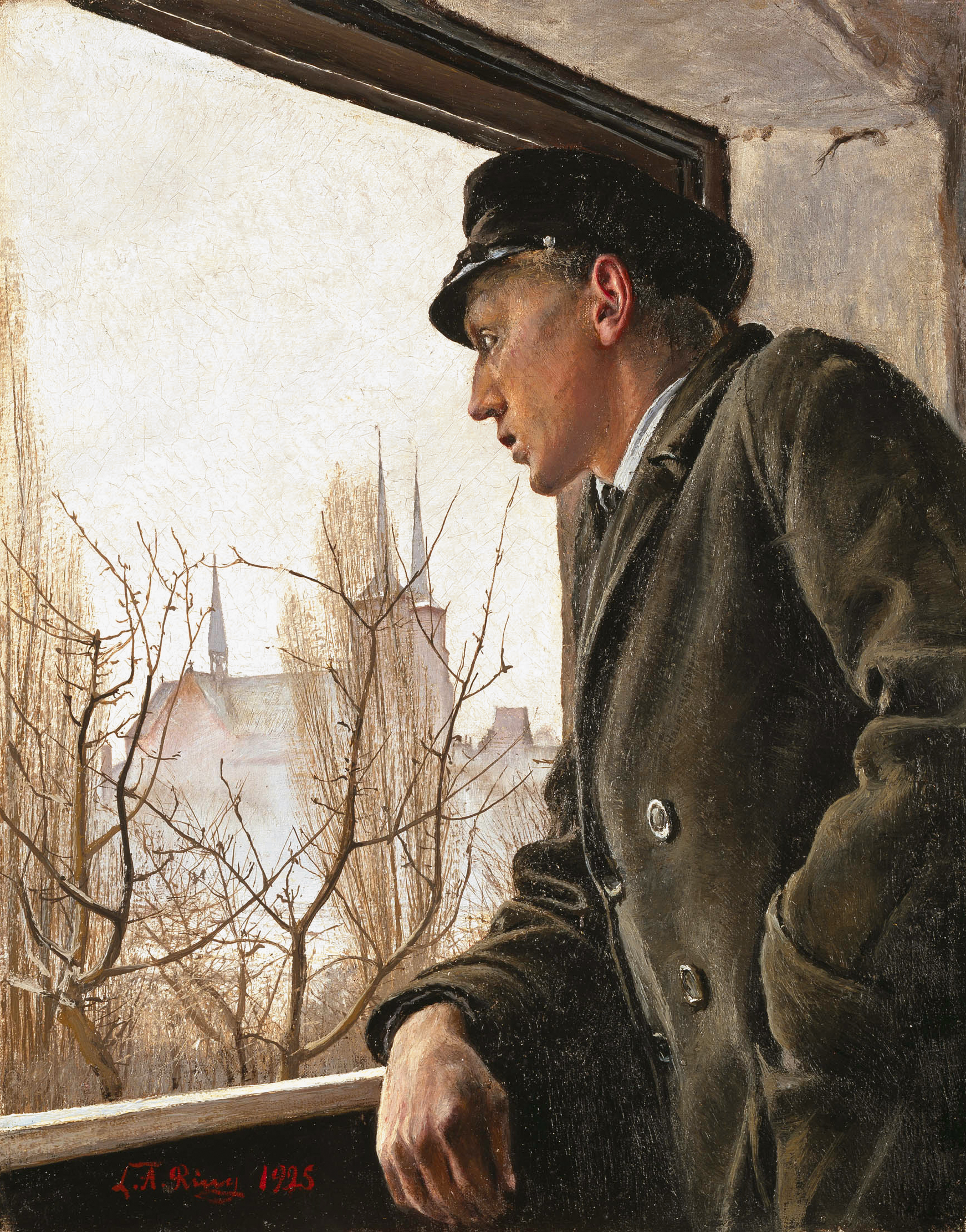
- Ole Ring by Laurits Andersen Ring (1925)
- Born: 6 August 1902; Hedehusene, Denmark
- Died: 2 May 1972 (aged 69); Køge, Zealand, Denmark
- Occupation: Painter
- Parent(s): L. A. Ring; Sigrid Kähler

Ole Ring (6 August 1902 – 2 May 1972) was a Danish painter.

== Biography ==
Ole Ring was born at Baldersbrønde in Hedehusene, Denmark. He was the youngest of three children of Laurits Andersen Ring and Sigrid Eing, née Kähler. The family lived in the L. A. Ring House in Roskilde from 1914. Ole Ring was taught to paint by his father who was a notable artist.

Ole Ring's work is strongly influenced by that of his father. He was a naturalist who painted numerous paintings of landscapes and village life on eastern Zealand. Ring preferred to paint in the autumn and winter months, and the images, which typically have a greyish, silvery tinge, were affected by the winter light in the color scheme. Unlike his father, he has also painted many cityscapes from Copenhagen.

He died in Køge and is buried at Klosterkirkegården.

== Selected works ==
- Vinteraften ved Roskildeøø (udst. 1926)
- Tubæk å mod øst (1942)
- Landsby med kirke (1947)
- Forår, Præstø
- Piletræer som spejler sig i et gadekær
- Losning af en paket i Nyhavn
- Hestetrukken vogn i Overgaden oven Vandet
