= Elise Brandes =

Danish sculptor (1873–1918)

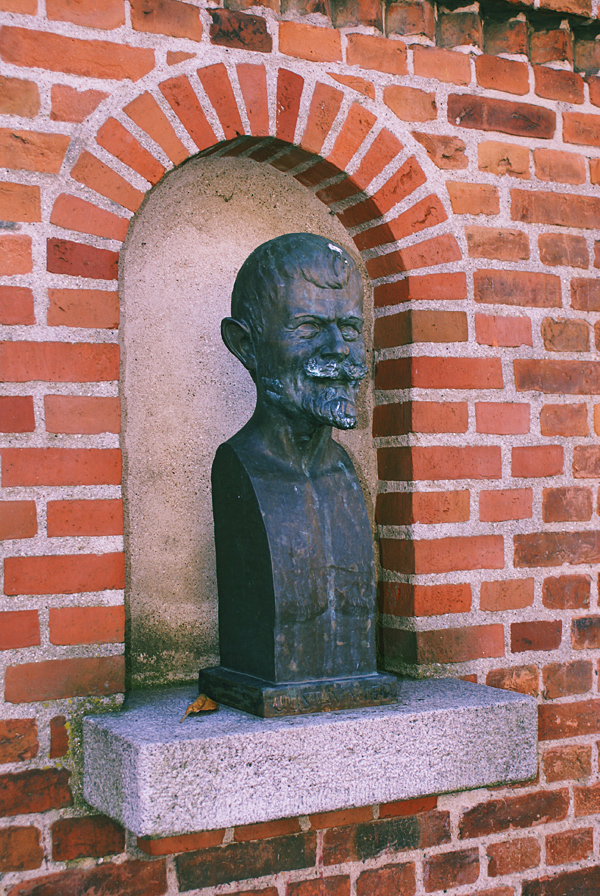
Elise Brandes' bust of Gustav Wied (1909)

Elise Brandes (née Rustad, 1873–1918) was a Danish sculptor who specialized in busts. She was the wife of the Danish politician and writer, Edvard Brandes.

== Biography ==
Brandes was born on 24 July 1873 in Lysaker, Bærum Municipality, in south-eastern Norway. She was the daughter of the physician Carl G. W. Rustad (1839–1918) and his wife Marie M. Hauge. After attending the Royal Drawing and Art School in Kristiania, she moved to Denmark where she studied at the Art School for Women (Kunstskolen for Kvinder) in Copenhagen. From 1905 to 1906, she was a student of Stephan Sinding at the Royal Danish Academy.

After marrying Edvard Brandes in 1900, she became associated with the political and cultural elite, several of whom she depicted in her busts. One of her most notable creations is that of the writer Gustav Wied (1909) with his subtle smile and his devilish look. Others depict Edvard's elder brother, the scholar Georg Brandes (1907), the actor Johannes Poulsen (1909), the literary historian Vilhelm Andersen (c. 1913) and the Swedish artist Anders Zorn (1917). Other notable pieces include a marble relief of Johannes Poulsen's father, Emil Poulsen (1906), and a bronze statuette of the actress Grethe Hasselbach dancing (1912), both of which are in Copenhagen's Theatre Museum. Brandes worked with a variety of materials such as sandstone, marble and wood. In her later years, she was unable to work owing to poor health. She died on 3 November 1918 in Copenhagen.

The architect Louis Hygom designed the house at Skodsborgvej 242A for her in 1917.

== Exhibitions ==
Brandes exhibited frequently at Charlottenborg (1906–17) as well as at Aarhus (1909), Malmö and Kristiania (both 1914). She held a solo exhibition at Winkel & Magnussen's gallery in Copenhagen in 1913.
