= Gustav Wied =

Danish writer (1858–1914)

Gustav Johannes Wied
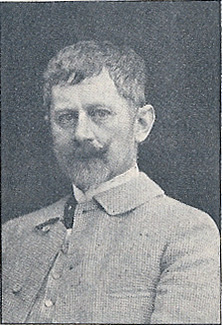
- Born: 6 March 1858; Branderslev, Denmark
- Died: 24 October 1914 (aged 56); Roskilde, Denmark
- Occupations: Novelist, short story writer, playwright

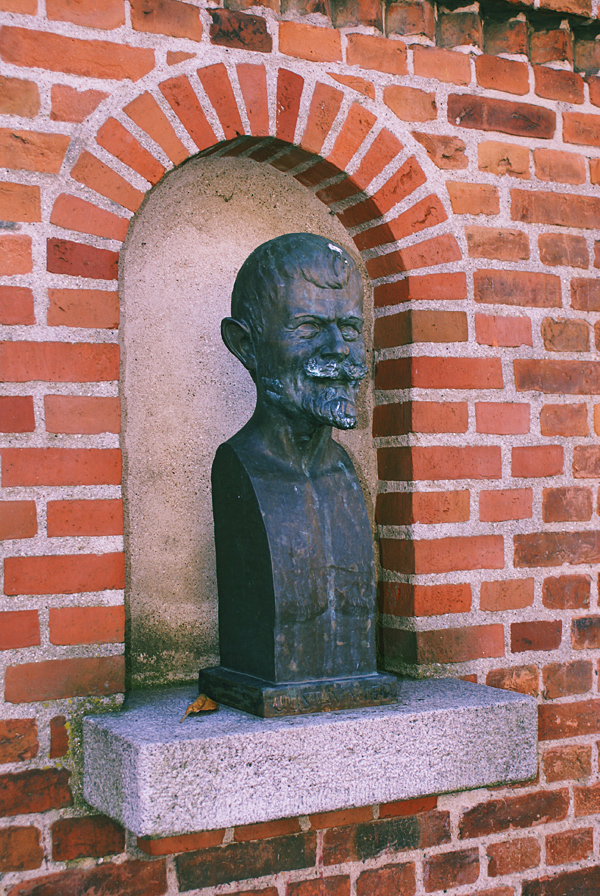
Bust (1908) of Gustav Wied by Elise Brandes

Gustav Johannes Wied (6 March 1858 – 24 October 1914) was a Danish writer. He was generally known as a satirical critic of society in his time and he deliberately used his writing talents to expose the establishment, bourgeoisie and ruling class. The government had him imprisoned for 14 days in 1882 for a short story published in a newspaper. Wied wrote novels, short stories, poems and plays (including several satyr plays).

== Biography ==
Gustav Wied was born in Branderslev near Nakskov as the fifth of eleven children by Carl August Wied and Catha Wied.

His best-known work is the novel Livsens Ondskab (1899), depicting life in a small provincial Danish town. The story revolves around customs official Knagsted, a red-bearded satyrical Diogenes, who openly ridicules the hypocrisy of the snobbish bourgeois inhabitants, and Emanual Thomsen, a tragic struggler, trying to obtain the funds needed to regain his ancestral farm. In the sequel Knagsted (1902), Wied let Knagsted comment on the contemporary fashionable society in the Bohemian spa resort of Karlsbad in Karlovy Vary.

Wied eventually lost popularity and fell ill, suffering from severe stomach aches. Badly affected by his condition and despondent, he committed suicide with an overdose of potassium cyanide in 1914. The Gustav Wied Society was established in 1938 with the purpose of publicizing knowledge about Gustav Wied and his literary legacy.

== Bibliography ==
Gustav Wied was very productive. Among his most notable works are:

- En Hjemkomst (play), 1889
- Silhuetter (short stories), 1891
- En Bryllupsnat (play), 1892
- Barnlige Sjæle (short stories), 1893
- Ungdomshistorier, 1895
- Slægten, 1898 (made into a film in 1978)
- Livsens ondskab, 1899 (made into a television series in 1971, first broadcast in 1972)
- Thummelumsen (play), 1901
- Skærmydsler, 1901
- Den gamle Pavillon (play), 1902
- Knagsted, 1902
- Dansemus (play), 1905
- Fædrene æde druer, 1908 (made into the film Sort høst in 1993)
- Circus Mundi (stories), 1909
- Kærlighed, Fire Idyller (play), 1909
- Ærtehalm (play), 1909
- Pastor Sørensen og Co., 1913
- Imellem Slagene (stories and a play), 1914
- Digt og virkelighed (recollections), 1914

English translations:

- Two Satyrical Dramas, (1999)

== Films ==
Many of Wieds stories and plays have been filmed, two in his own lifetime, both black and white silent movies. The first was "Kærlighed og Selvmord" (Love and Suicide), released in 1911. It is a pantomime, following his own manuscript but with unknown director. The second film "Das Feuer" (The Fire) was produced in Germany and released on 4 May 1914, the same year Wied committed suicide. It is an adapted screenplay written by Karl Freund after one of Wied's novels. After his death, the first Wied-related film "Thummelumsen " was released in 1941, an adapted screenplay of his 1901 play by the same name. Most of the posthumous films has been Danish TV productions, but a few of them was produced in Sweden and Finland.

The latest Wied-film was "Sort høst" (Black harvest), a cinema film released in 1993. It is an adapted screenplay drama of Wied's "Fædrene Æde Druer" from 1908, produced by film director Anders Refn.

== See also ==
- Kastellet (Roskilde)
