= H. A. Brendekilde =

Danish painter

Hans Andersen Brendekilde
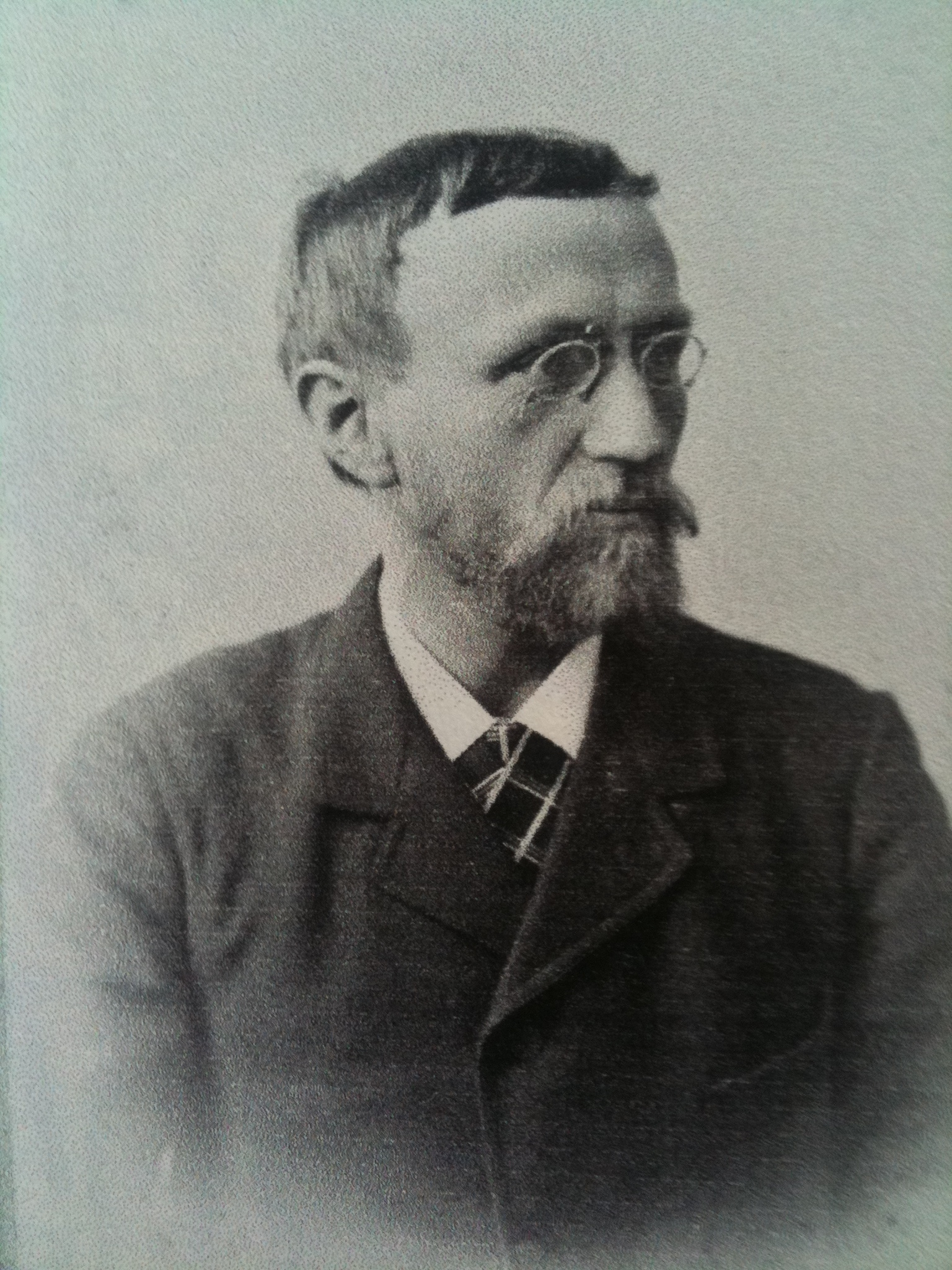
- H. A. Brendekilde (date unknown)
- Born: Hans Andersen; April 7, 1857; Brændekilde, Odense Municipality
- Died: March 30, 1942 (aged 84); Jyllinge
- Known for: Worn Out (1889)
- Movement: Socialrealism and modern breakthrough

Hans Andersen Brendekilde (7 April 1857 – 30 March 1942) was a Danish painter.

== Biography ==
Brendekilde grew up in Braendekilde, a small village close to Odense on the island of Funen. He was a distant relation of Hans Christian Andersen, the writer of fairytales, and like his relation he had a very poor childhood. The fathers of both were clog makers. At the age of 4 Brendekilde left his parents and lived with his grandparents until the age of 10 when he made his living as a shepherd, getting board and lodging. At school a teacher discovered his ability to carve animals in wood and from 1871 until 1874 he was apprenticed to the wood carver and stonemason Wilhelm Hansen in Odense. In 1877 he was educated as a flower painter by O.A. Hermansen and the same year he was admitted to the Royal Danish Academy of Fine Arts in Copenhagen. His teachers were the sculptors Jens Adolf Jerichau and Harald Conradsen (1817–1905). At the academy he found many friends who remained faithful to each other for the rest of their lives. In 1881 he left the academy with distinction. Though educated as a sculptor he immediately started as a painter. Brendekilde and L.A. Ring are the first Danish painters who grew up among poor people in the countryside and depicted the true conditions of life in rural Denmark in the period from 1880 to 1920. They are social realist open-air painters, depicting poor people whether working in the fields or in their houses, showing the tragic sides of life. In this sense they belong to the so-called modern breakthrough or rather popular breakthrough. Among others, the authors Henrik Pontoppidan (Nobel Prize in Literature 1917) and Jens Peter Jacobsen are representatives of the modern breakthrough in Denmark. Brendekilde's friend Martin Andersen Nexø represents the popular breakthrough in literature.

Brendekilde's influence was great not only on society, but also on his many friends among painters and potters. Among the painters especially on L.A. Ring. During their young and poor years they were sharing room and studio in Copenhagen for periods. They painted similar themes, both had the family name Andersen and they were therefore often confused with one another. So in 1884 they changed their family names Andersen to the names of their native villages instead, Brendekilde and Ring. Brendekilde was always in a good mood, was deeply committed to paint life in the small villages, and furthermore was an ardent socialist. Ring was of a more depressive disposition and Brendekilde encouraged him to continue painting and join exhibitions. Brendekilde also introduced Ring to Lars Ebbesen, who had a farm "Petersminde" in "Raagelund" close to Odense. In 1883, Ring was living in extreme poverty in Copenhagen, but the introduction to Lars Ebbesen meant that he could live and paint without worrying about the cost of rent and food for long periods. Both Brendekilde and Ring remained lifelong friends with farm owner Ebbesen. Several of Brendekilde's paintings became very famous and won medals e.g. at the World Expositions in Paris 1889, in Chicago 1893 and at the “Jahresausstellung” im Glaspalast in München 1891. He also inspired painters like his friends Julius Paulsen, Peder Mønsted, Hans Smidth, Paul Fischer, Søren Lund and H. P. Carlsen.

Brendekilde is the first painter bringing the Arts and Crafts movement to Denmark when from about 1884 he designed and made integrated frames around his paintings, the frames being part of the paintings and their story. Some frames were symbolistic and others more ornamental.

Many of his paintings are obviously related to those by Anna and Michael Ancher, P.S. Krøyer and the Swedish painters Carl Larsson and Anders Zorn. All of these displayed their paintings at the international exhibitions in Copenhagen 1888, Paris 1889, Munich 1891 and Chicago 1893.

Brendekilde illustrated some novels by Henrik Pontoppidan. Pontoppidan made use of Brendekilde as a model for the painter Jørgen Hallager – a socialist and a hero – in his famous novel Nattevagt (The Night Watch; 1894). Henrik Pontoppidan immediately realized that Worn Out is a painting encouraging revolution. The reason for this is that the woman has no tears in her wide open eyes, she wears a most unusual red sweater and her red hair symbolizes blood and a scream for a better future. In this novel Henrik Pontoppidan interpreted the dead man in Worn Out as a martyr. Brendekilde also illustrated Vilhelm Bergsøe's book Nissen (1889). He is regarded to be the first artist working with glass in Denmark making decorations and forms for the Glassworks of Funen in Odense from 1901 to 1904. He is also the first artist working for the famous pottery of Herman A. Kähler from 1885 to 1907. He introduced several friends to Kähler and they continued working at the pottery for years. Among others Carl Ove Julian Lund (1857–1936), who made important contributions to the ceramic field. Lund and Brendekilde also introduced their common friend, Karl Hansen Reistrup (1863–1929), and he became the most important and productive of all the famous potters. The introduction of L.A. Ring who married Sigrid, Kähler's daughter, was not essential to the production of ceramics but very important to the family and their history which he depicted on many occasions.

Besides being a social realistic painter, Brendekilde also painted portraits. Furthermore, he is one of the few impressionistic painters in Denmark. Later in life he became more and more aware of the idyllic sides of life in the country side, painting people, children and flowers. He built a big house in Jyllinge and grew more than 3000 species of flowers in his famous garden, which in many ways reminds one of Claude Monet's garden in Giverny.

Brendekilde died on 30 March 1942 in Jyllinge.

In the 21st century, Brendekilde has been made the subject of intensive studies in the Danish school system and among others he is an inspiration to neo realistic painters like Søren Hagen, Ulrik Møller, Søren Martinsen and Allan Otte. Their paintings depict problematic aspects of farming and rural life today. Brendekilde´s paintings are discussed and reproduced in several important books on the history of Danish culture. His painting of flowers and animals are mentioned among the best pictures illustrating the material and spiritual correlation between vegetation, animals and the Danes. He is considered to be an outstanding painter of children.

== Works and motives ==
=== Social realistic motives ===
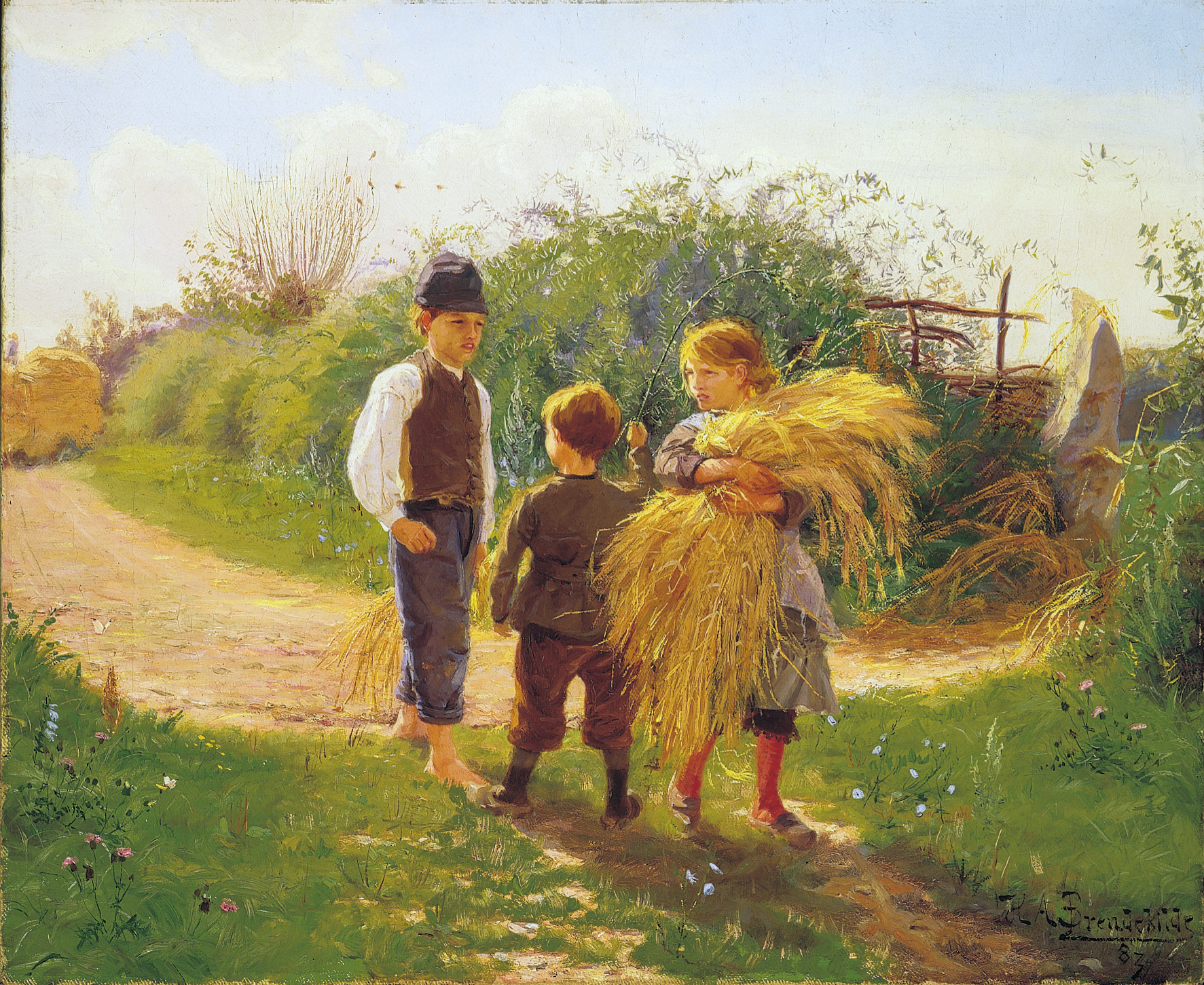
Akssamlere, Raagelund, 1883, Brandts. Children collecting leftover crops

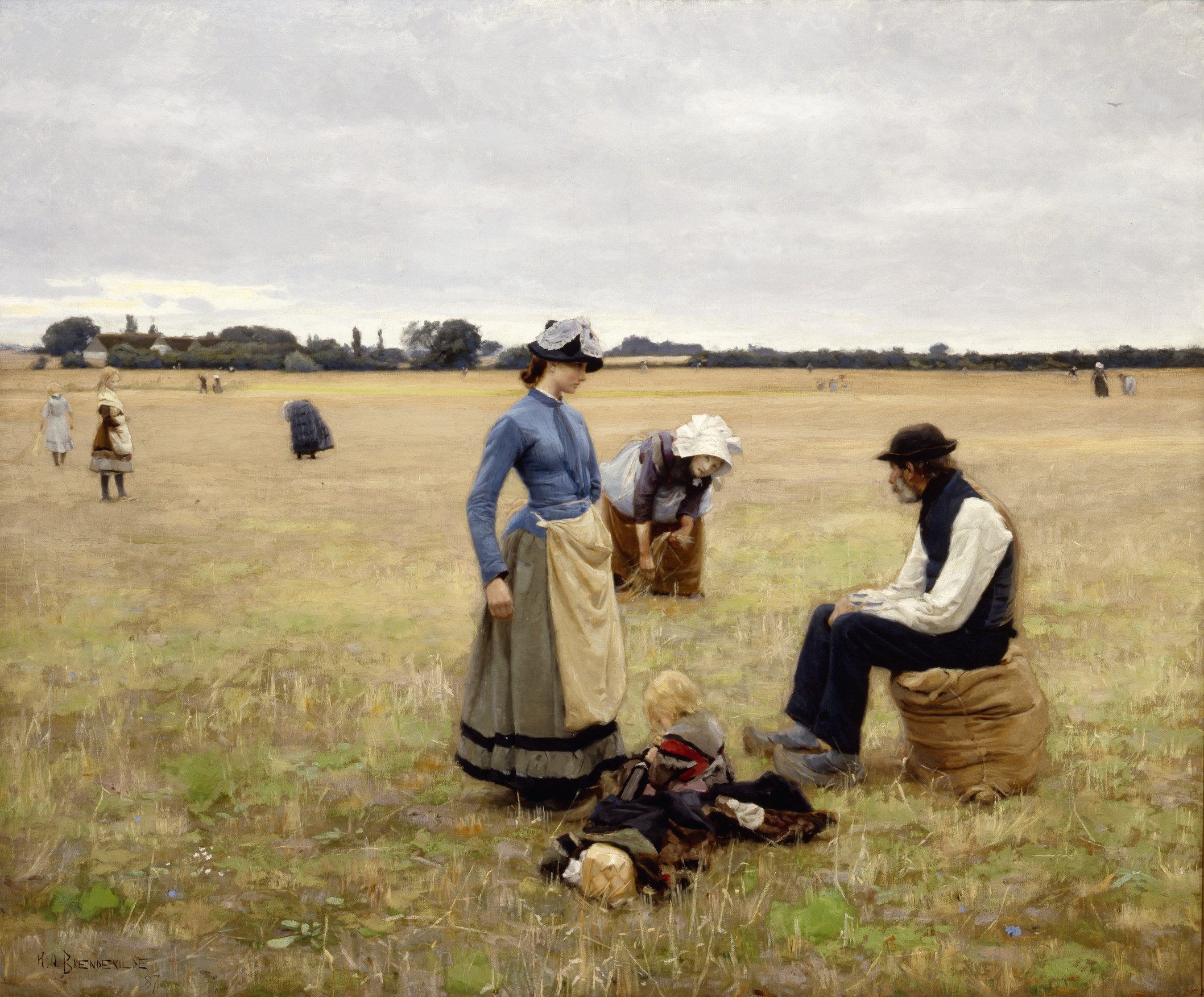
Fortrykt or Oppressed, 1887, Brandts. Poor children and very old people without land are allowed gleaning – collecting leftover crops – from farmers' fields, a kind of welfare system descending from the directives in the Bible (Leviticus 19:9–10 and Ruth 2). In this painting a young maid and her fatherless child arrive from the city to live with her parents.

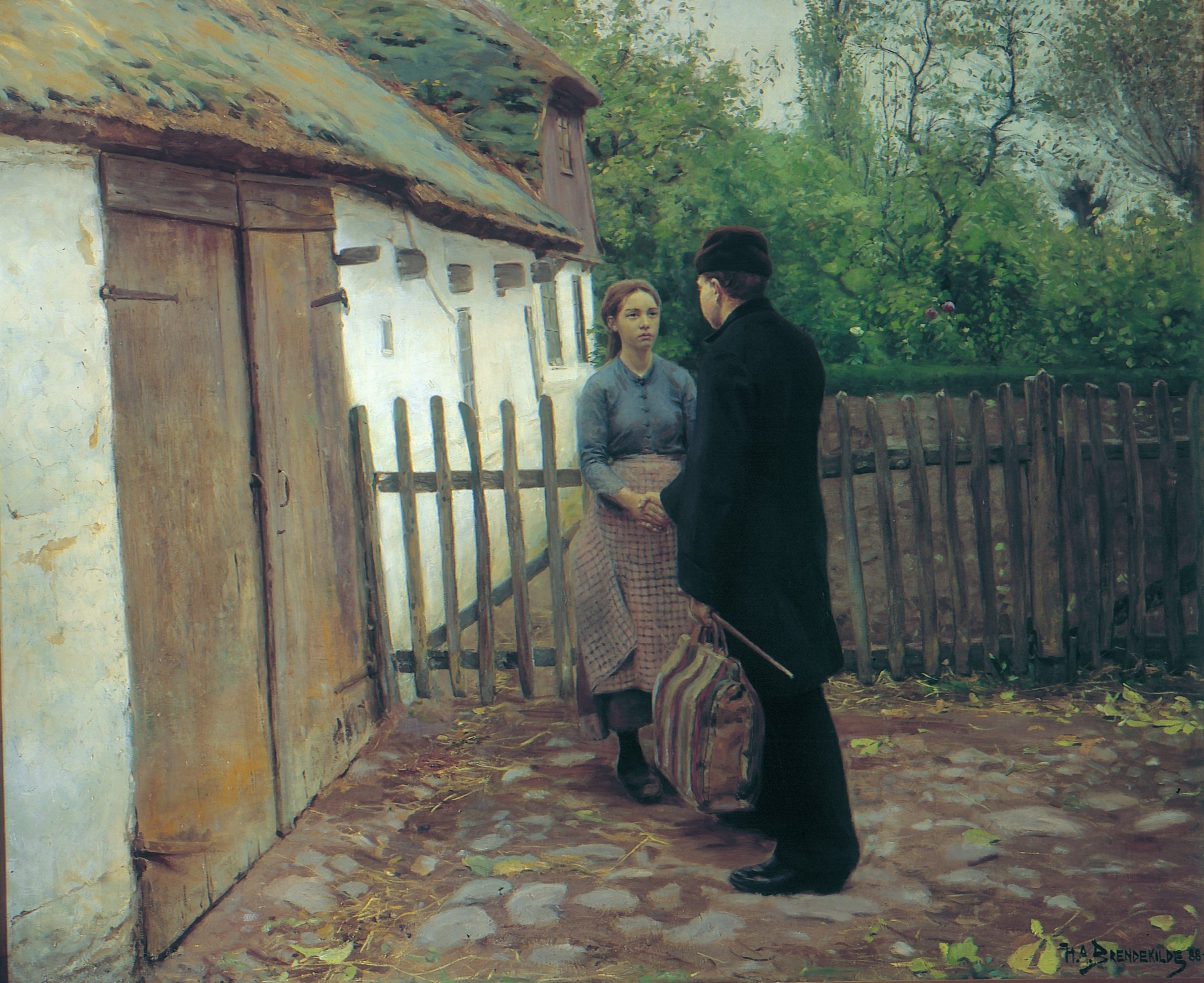
Afskeden or Goodbye, exhibited at the World Exposition in Chicago 1893. It depicts a young man preparing to emigrate, perhaps to the United States of America for which several of Brendekilde's siblings left.

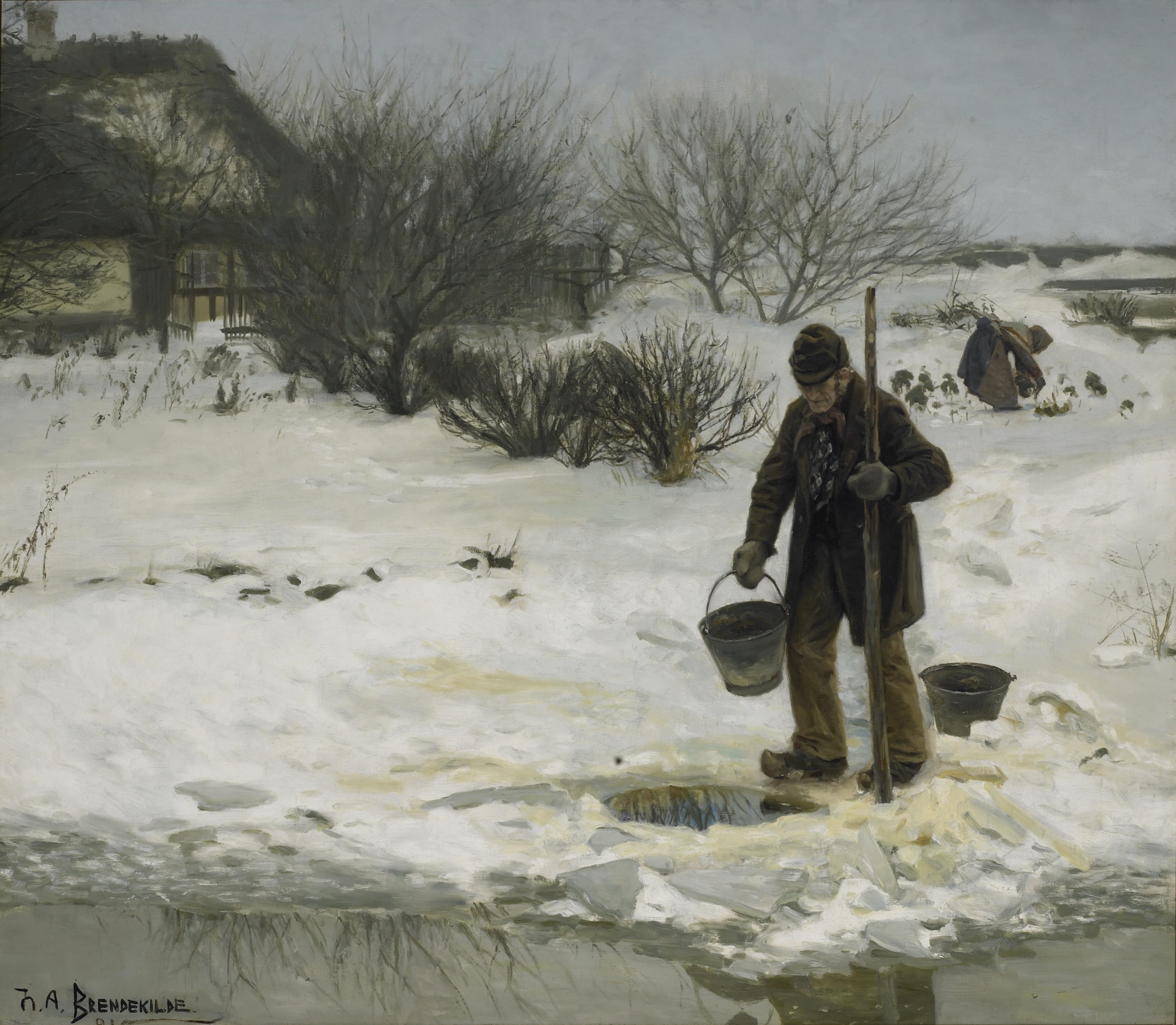
Tøsne or break in the frost, 1895, Brandts Odense

=== Religious motives ===
En Landevej or A Highway, 1893, National Gallery of Denmark. Depicts the difficult living conditions of the stonebreakers, who made the foundations of our endless roads, and how the church with its missionaries and high walls cannot help poor people.

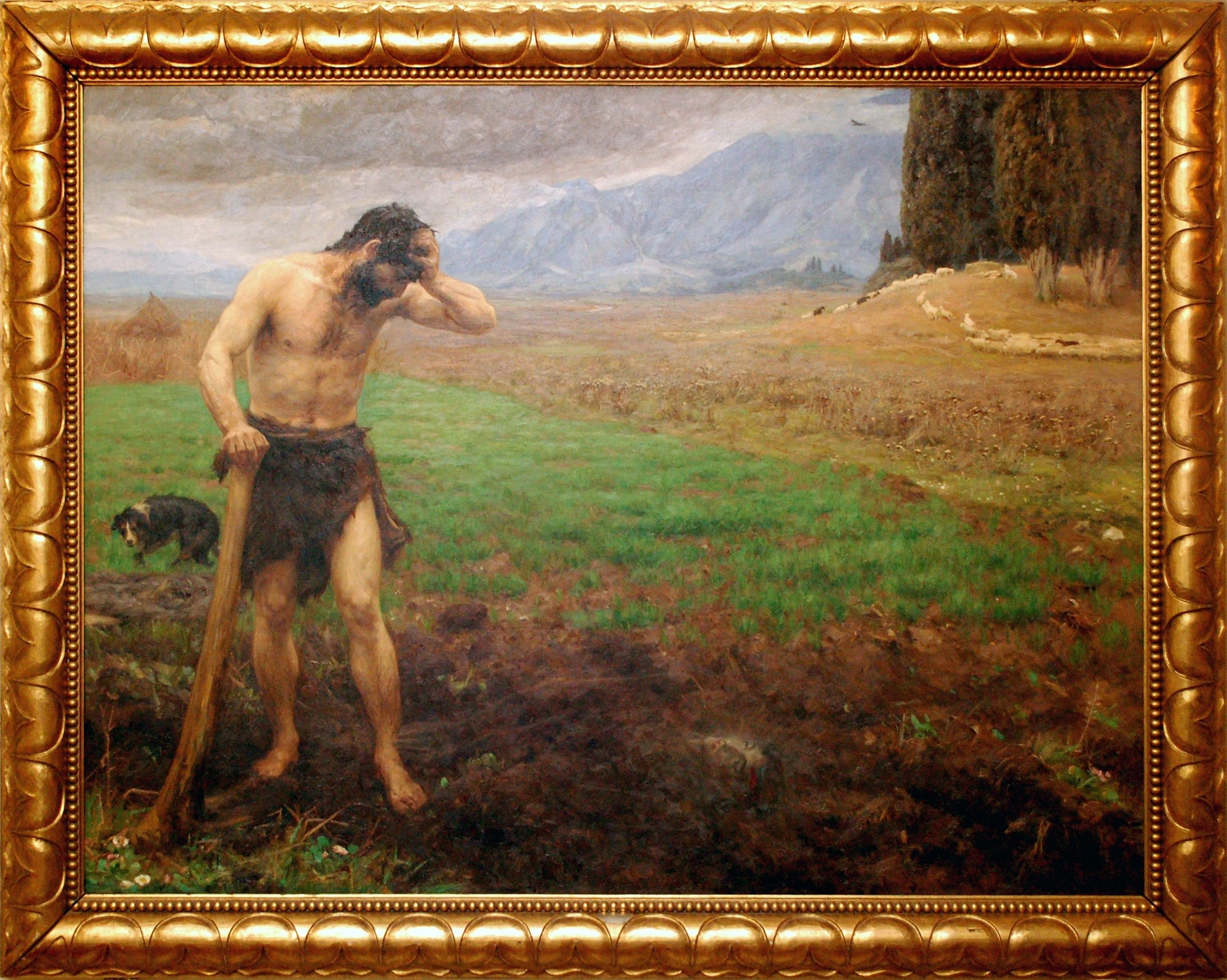
Kain having killed his brother, Abel 1896. Freemason Cimbria Aalborg. Notice Brendekilde's frame which he has carved himself

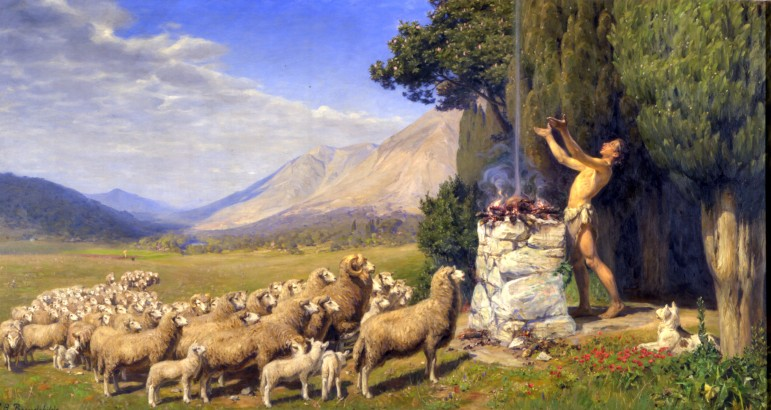
Abel´s sacrifice, 1908, Dahesh Museum of Art, New York

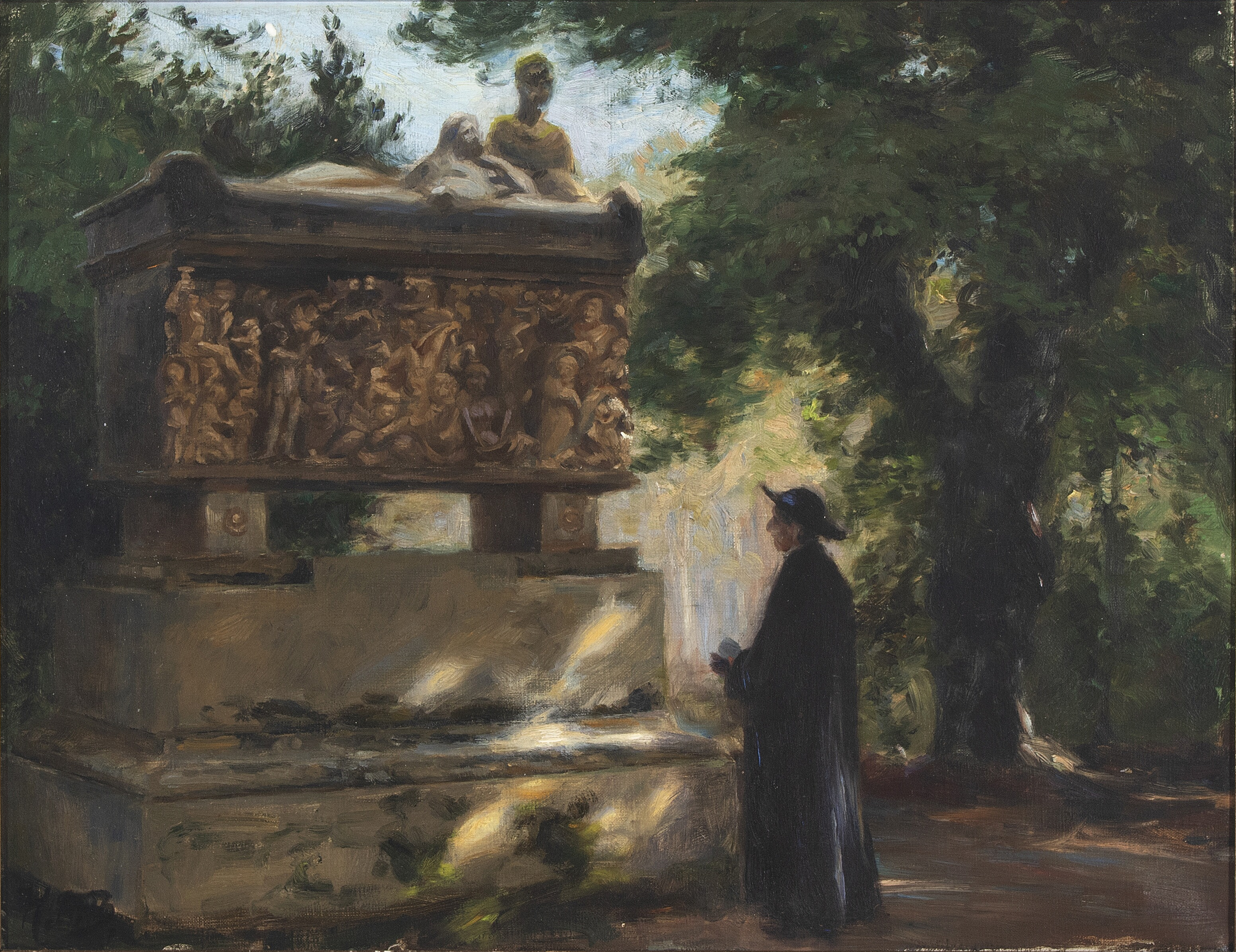
Catholic pater in front of a sarcophagus, 1909, Italy, Privately owned

== Most famous work ==
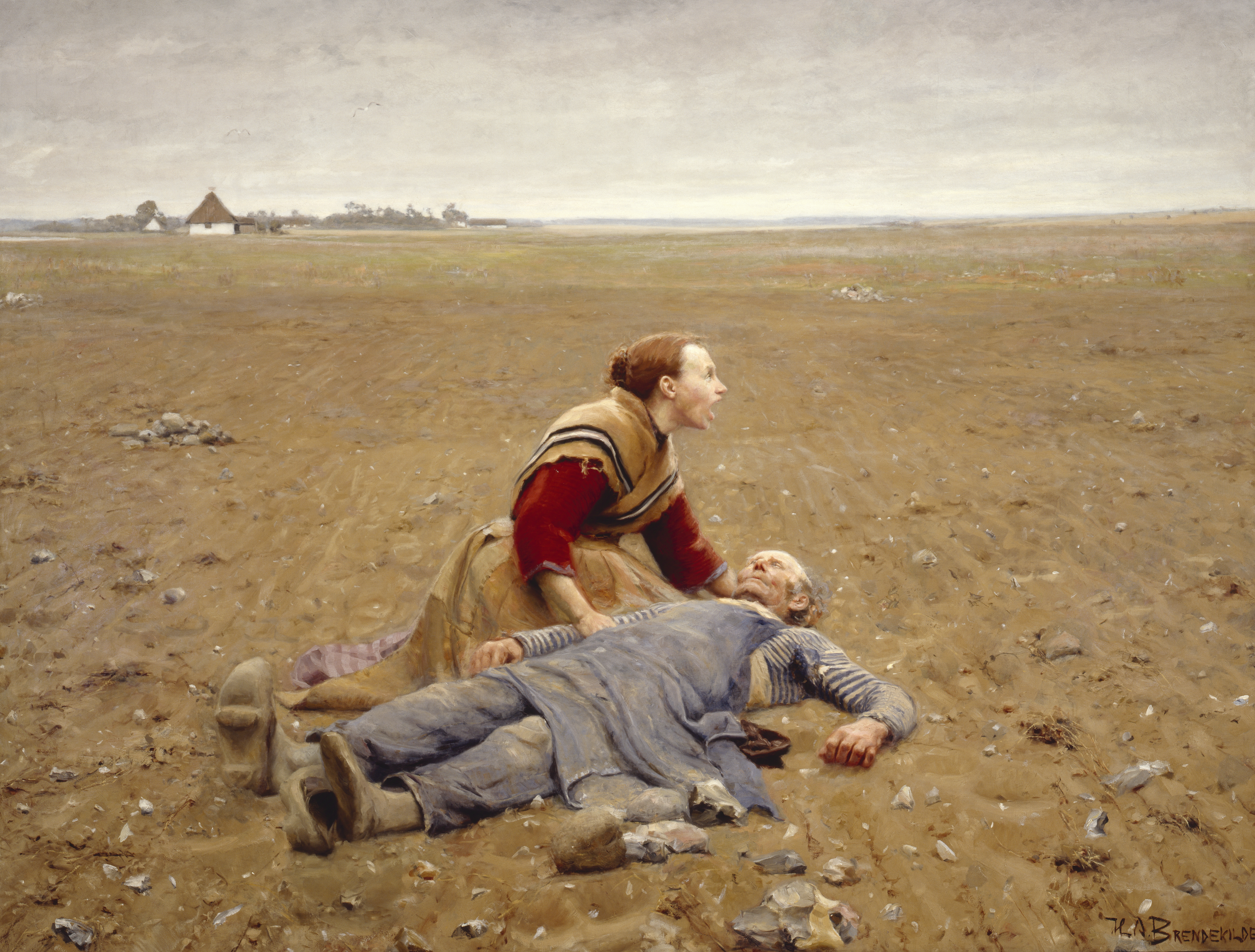
Udslidt or Worn Out or The Martyr, 1889, Brandts Odense

This painting is regarded as one of the most important, social realistic painting in Denmark. Moreover it has had a great influence.

=== Influence internationally ===
==== Edvard Munch ====
Brendekilde's most famous painting is Udslidt (Worn Out). He painted it for the World Exposition in Paris 1889, the 100 years celebration of the French Revolution. In the catalogue it is called Au Secours. It was exhibited in Copenhagen 1890, Munich 1891 (Zu Hülfe) and Chicago 1893 (Worn Out). Since then it has been permanently exhibited at Brandts in Odense. Worn Out was again exhibited in Groningen and in Munich in 2012 and 2013. This painting is monumental (207 x 270 cm) and in the centre a woman is screaming over a dead man, worn out due to hard labour in the still feudal and poor, rural society. Edvard Munch had several Danish friends and he often visited and stayed in Copenhagen. One of his good, Danish friends, the painter Johan Rohde, accompanied him to the great Exhibition of Nordic Painters in Copenhagen in 1888, when Brendekilde was represented with 5 paintings, among these his large and almost impressionistic Forår (Spring), a painting of a forest with anemones and a young couple and mounted in one of his impressive arts and crafts frames. Munch had two paintings at this exhibition. In those years Munch was in his naturalistic-impressionistic period and he must have seen Brendekilde's big and magnificent paintings. In Paris 1889 Brendekilde was represented by Worn Out and three other paintings, and Munch had one painting at this exhibition. Edvard Munch lived in Paris and visited the World Exhibition several times. Brendekilde also visited the exhibition. The paintings of both artists were in the same building “Palais des Beaux Arts” first floor. Worn Out was in the room “Denmark” and Munch's painting Morning is in the room “Norway”. The same entrance led to these two rooms, and there was no door between them. Thus Munch could not avoid seeing Worn Out, the monumental painting with ”the scream” in the centre. Worn Out even received a silver medal. One must remember that through all his life Munch suffered from fear of death. His mother and sister died in 1868 and 1877 and his father died in November 1889, at the same time when he saw Worn Out with the dead man and his wife screaming. From now on Munch may have seen Worn Out one or two times more as well as printed copies and have discussed it with his friends or Rohde in Denmark. Worn Out was exhibited in Copenhagen in 1890. It is not certain but possible that Munch visited this exhibition. In Munich 1891 Brendekilde was represented by Worn Out (German Zu Hülfe) and one of his Winter Landscapes. He received a gold medal. Munch had 3 paintings at this exhibition. It is doubtful but possible that Munch visited this exhibition.

Brendekilde's scream seems to be the first scream of a living person mentioned by name in the history of painting. It depicts a living person's reaction to a state of society. The names of both models are well known and they were wife and husband. In 1889–1891 (probably 1889) Munch made a preliminary sketch for the scream – “ Mann som går langs en vei” – with a lonely old worn out man walking with a stick alone in a road in a flat Danish landscape with trees in the background, reminding one very much of Worn Out. One can also compare it with the preliminary study to Worn Out. This preliminary study is Stensamlere or Stone Collectors, painted between 1883 and 1887. In Stone Collectors, three persons and an old man stand between furrows similar to the road lines in Munch's sketch. Four years passed after the painting of Worn Out (1889) before Munch painted The Scream ("Skrik") in 1893. Munch had many strange explanations of the background for The Scream. Studies of letters, notes and sketches by Munch do not give much information concerning other artists. To art historians and Munch specialists this research and theory is totally new. Munch was from the beginning inspired by Brendekilde's original scream in Worn Out, which he transformed into his symbolistic scream of desperation, alienation and anxiety in the new state of society. It is probably a self-portrait. There is a direct line from Munch's Scream to the well-known screams later in the 20. century (Pablo Picasso, Francis Bacon, Asger Jorn, Andy Warhol etc.). In 2007 Max Ginsburg painted War Pieta, which reminds one of Worn Out.

==== Gustav Vigeland ====
Vigeland is the most famous sculptor in Norway. Most people know him from his more than 200 sculptures in Frogner Park in Oslo. Early in his life he made two small sculptures screaming: Fear (1892) and Old Man (1893). Both are exhibited in The National Museum in Oslo. His inspiration for making these two screaming sculptures in miniature has been a mystery, but he was an apprentice in Copenhagen from the first week in 1891–1892 in the workshop of the Danish sculptor Vilhelm Bissen, who among others was a professor at The Royal Academy of Fine Arts at Charlottenborg. Brendekilde and Bissen knew each other very well; they were both educated as sculptors and exhibited their works at the same exhibitions during this period. E.g. Brendekilde showed Worn Out and Bissen showed two sculptures at Charlottenborg in Copenhagen in 1890. Worn Out was alternately shown outside Denmark and back again in 1891–1893. Vigeland exhibited his sculpture at Charlottenborg in 1892. It would have been difficult for Gustav Vigeland not to become acquainted with the scream of Worn Out.

==== Axel Gallén ====
Brian Dudley Barrett in his Ph.D. thesis 2008 mentions Brendekilde (p. 48) and Worn Out (p. 25) and calls attention to the similarity between the position of the bodies in Worn Out and Axel Gallén's famous Lemminkäinen's Mother(1897). In both cases the bodies form a triangle and the woman is sitting up, the dead man lying down. In both cases the woman turns her head and eyes towards God or the light from the sun. Lemminkäinen's mother does not scream, but she is also a sorceress having the situation under control, sewing her dead son together and wakening him to life again. Axel Gallén is originally a painter of social realism like Brendekilde but later he changes his style and becomes a symbolistic painter. In this case he illustrates song XV in Kalevala - the Finnish heroic legend - where Lemminkäinen is the young hero. At The World Exposition, Paris 1889, Gallén had four oil paintings in Palais des Beaux Arts where Worn Out was exhibited. He was in Paris in May 1889 and must have seen Worn Out. As a painter of social realism he immediately understood the message of Brendekilde and also realized the double nature of the scream coming from a worn out person or as an omen of a fight reflecting that the persons in Worn Out are heroes like Lemminkäinen and his mother.

== Selected paintings ==
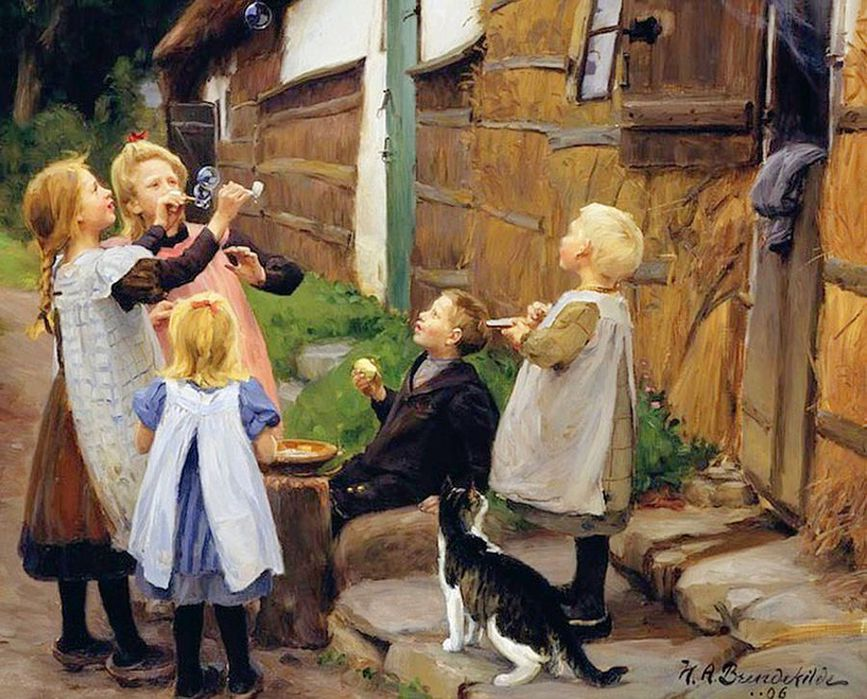
Blowing Bubbles (1906)

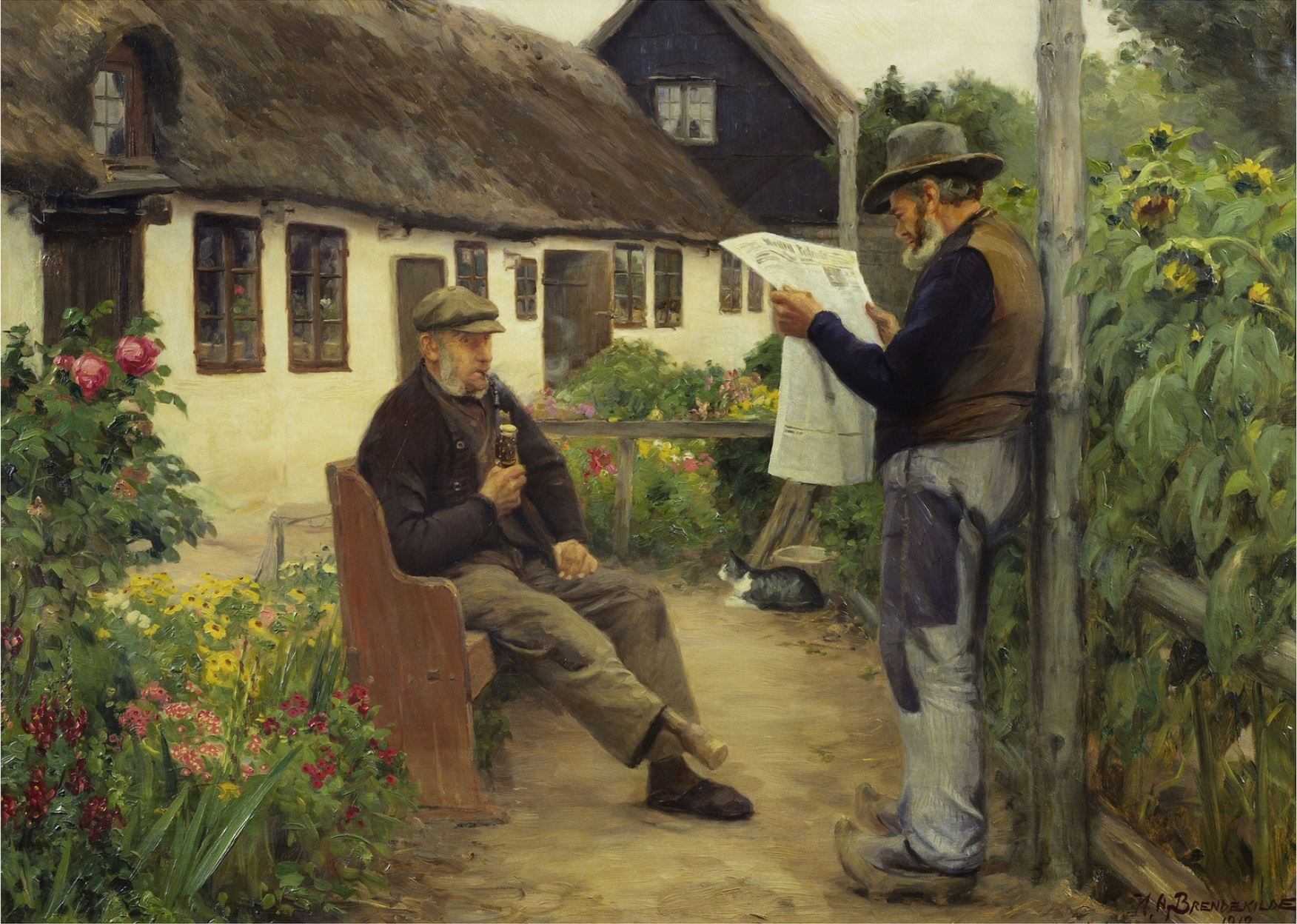
Reading the Newspaper (1912)

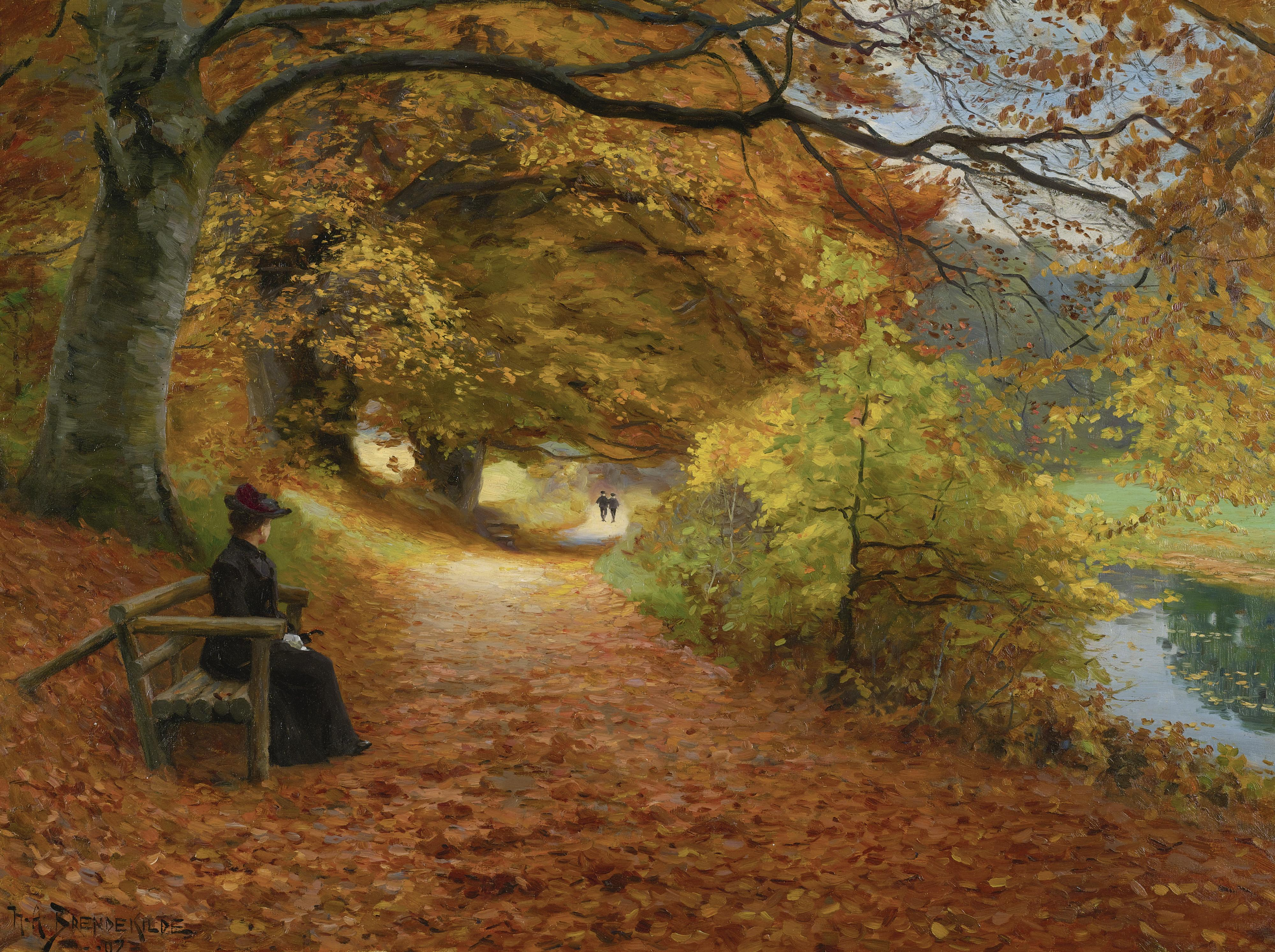
A wooded Path in Autumn (1902)

== Literature ==
- Sonne, Ralph (2018), H.A. Brendekilde - Værk og betydning i dansk kunst- og kulturhistorie, Multivers, ISBN 978-87-7917-624-9 published by Multivers.dk, Copenhagen, Denmark, p.p. 1- 238, 140 illustrations Updated monography with an English summary.
- Gertrud Hvidberg Hansen, Brendekildes Billedverden, Odense Bys Museer, 2001, ISBN 9788778386274
- Ralph Sonne Glimt af Bellinge & Brændekilde Sognes Historie, Bellinge Lokalhistorisk Forening, 2017, ISSN 1603-6948
- ”Kunstnerbrødre L.A. Ring og H.A. Brendekilde, Catalogue from a current exhibition 2018-2020 at Randers Kunstmuseum, Brandts, Nivaagaard, 2018, ISBN 978-87-88075-65-6
- Nielsen, Henry; Fogh, Dorte (2016), På sporet af Banevogteren, Et ikonisk maleri fra 1884, Aarhus Universitetsforlag, ISBN 978-87-7124-933-0
- Hvidberg-Hansen, Gertrud; Andersen, Niels; Rehde Nielsen, Anders; Schou-Christensen, Jørgen (2004), Brendekildes glas : form og dekoration for Fyens Glasværk, Odense Bys Museer, ISBN 87-7838-930-5
