= Eva Sørensen =

Danish sculptor and ceramist (1940–2019)

- Born: 14 February 1940; Herning
- Died: 31 December 2019 (aged 79); Verbania, Italy
- Known for: Sculpture
- Awards: Eckersberg Medal (1979)

Eva Sørensen (February 14, 1940 - December 31, 2019) was a prolific Danish sculptor and ceramist whose granite and marble works are exhibited in museums and public spaces across Denmark. She died in Verbania in Italy.

== Life and work ==
Born in Herning on 14 February 1940, Sørensen was the daughter of the manufacturer Niels Sørensen and his wife Magda Johanne Benedikte Thomasen. After matriculating from Herning Gymnasium in 1958, she moved to Copenhagen where she became an apprentice with the painter Mogens Andersen. Although she is now a recognized sculptor, she was initially interested in ceramics. Aware that she needed to pursue her studies abroad, in 1959 she went to Paris, where she studied at the Académie du Feu under László Szabó. The following year she returned to Denmark, where she became a student of the ceramist Christian Poulsen in Lyngby. Thereafter she studied in Faenza, Italy, at the Istituto statale d’arte per la ceramica where she focused on terracotta sculpture.

On her return to Denmark in the early 1960s, she was employed as a ceramist by Herman A. Kähler in Næstved. In 1962, she won first prize in the Festival della ceramica in Albisola and, in 1964, she received the Danish annual award for folk art for her new interpretation in ceramics. Designing increasingly abstract works, she began to use other materials such as wood and marble. During the 1970s, she settled in Pietrasanta, the Italian centre for sculpture, where she worked with green granite from Montorfano. In 1977, she moved close to the quarry, adapting her sculpture to the natural markings in the stone. Her talent for adapting her works to the surrounding landscape or architecture contributed to her reputation as one of Denmark's most successful women sculptors, especially in regard to large decorative creations.

In 2014 the Municipality of Milan together with the non - profit organisation Cramum and the Danish Embassy in Rome promoted her last solo exhibition "1962-1982“. The exhibition was hold at the Studio Museo Francesco Messina and it was curated by Sabino Maria Frassà and Andi Kacziba.

One of the most notable pieces is her fibreglass and polyester work for the Danish Arts Foundation in 1971 which stands in the atrium of a Fakse nursing home. This was followed in 1974 by a marble sculpture for the residence for Danish students in Flensburg, Germany, and a wood and marble work in Tårnby. Another of her large granite works is the sculpture over two metres tall in the entrance hall of the hospital in Frederikssund.

In 1968, Sørensen became a member of the Grønningen artists' cooperative and in 1979 she was awarded the Eckersberg Medal. In 1982, she represented Denmark at the Venice biennale becoming the first woman to do so since 1948.
