= In the garden door. The artist's wife =

1897 painting by L.A. Ring

- I havedøren. Kunstnerens hustru (Danish)
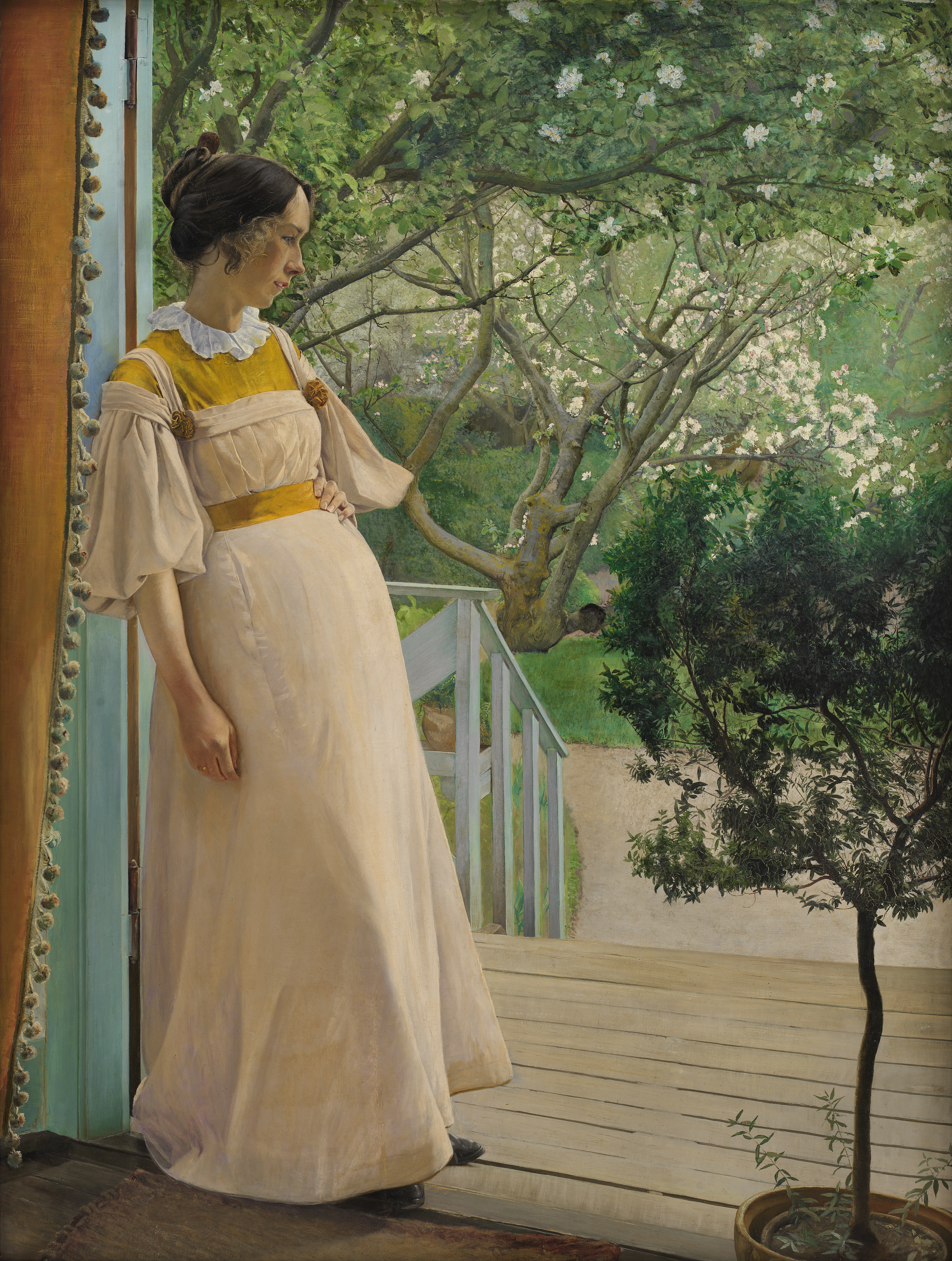
- Artist: L. A. Ring
- Year: 1897
- Medium: oil on canvas
- Dimensions: 191 cm × 144 cm (75 in × 57 in)
- Location: National Gallery of Denmark

In the garden door. The artist's wife is an oil painting executed in 1897 by the Danish artist L. A. Ring. It is a portrait of his wife Sigrid Kähler (1874–1923), whom he married in 1896. The painting is 191 × 144 cm and is owned by the National Gallery of Denmark.

== Description ==
Ring suggests in the painting human frailty by equating Sigrid's stomach with the vegetation's almost crippled stem and branch structure. It has been interpreted as the artist's "reminder of the fragility that also includes the emerging life as perceived by man and nature." The image's contrast between cold and warm colors contribute to the feeling of space. In the foreground to the left penetrates warm orange and yellow colors of the curtain and the dress while the cooler green and blue colors remain in the image's background.

Ring was 42 years old when he painted the portrait of his wife, who was 22 at the time. From this context, art historians interpret the painting as a love letter to his pregnant wife, which positions the trip looking to the spring blooming flora, symbolizing love. For example, myrtle over her head is a symbol of Aphrodite in Greek mythology, and myrtle was traditionally used to decorate the bride at weddings in Denmark. There's also an underlying gloom in this painting, assumed to be a symbol of death, "the real underlying theme, or rather, the life experience of Ring trying to handle and dispose of paint."

== Style ==
L. A. Ring has been described as a pioneer of Danish Symbolism, and his works have been described as an expression of social realism. In recent years, the field of art history has generally accepted that these two aspects of his work are equally important and complement each other. It has also been pointed out that "In the garden door" represents an alternative view of women to Romanticism's idealized view of the female figure. The painting adds to a number of Danish artists' monumental portraits of women and wives from the turn of the 20th century. Images that display a woman that's gradually released from the Romantics' body and intellectual motherhood towards a more independent and confident woman with both body and brains.

== Literature ==
- Hjorth, Ulla: Kunstværkets krav, Festskrift til Erik Fischer (1990), s. 91–97
- Hornung, Peter Michael: Realismen, Ny dansk kunsthistorie, bd. 4, (1993), s. 203–29
- Nykjær Mogens: Kundskabens billeder (1991), s. 135-42
