= Christian Falster =

Danish writer

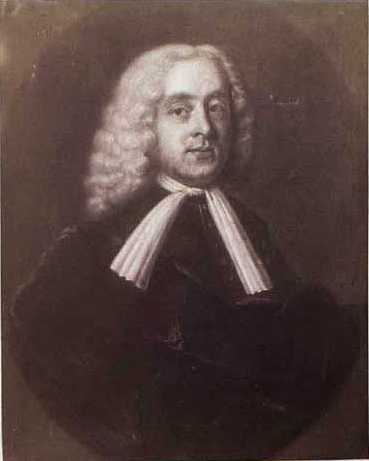
Christian Falster

Christian Falster (January 1, 1690 – October 24, 1752) was a Danish poet and philologist, born at Branderslev (island of Laaland). He became rector of the school at Ribe. He preferred to live there, refusing to accept better positions, and keeping his rectorship. He published translations of Ovid (1719) and the Satires of Juvenal (1731); 11 original satires on his times, often reprinted (1720–39); and in Latin a number of works, such as Viglia Prima Noctium Ripensiun (1721); Memoriæ Obscuræ (1722); Amœnitates Philologicæ (three volumes, 1821–32).

The editors of The Classical Journal wrote that:

Falster thought that all learning should be brought to bear upon theology, and, like Erasmus, he though [sic] that classical authors could contribute much toward sound religion. Falster's work covered a broad field from the history of Greek literature on the one hand, to Latin lexicography on the other, recognizing that philology, in the narrow sense, and literature are inextricably interwoven.
