= Branderslev =

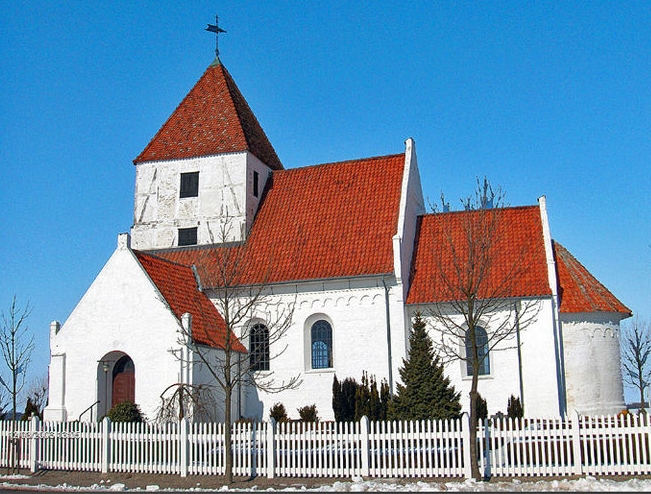
Branderslev church

Branderslev is a small village in Lolland, Denmark that is situated 4 kilometres (2.5 mi) southeast of Sandby and 3 kilometres (1.9 mi) north of Nakskov. As of 1 January 2025, the town has a population of 202. Branderslev is administered under Lolland Municipality and is located in Zealand Region.

== Notable people ==
- Christian Falster (1690 in Branderslev – 1752) a Danish poet and philologist, became rector of the school at Ribe.
- Gustav Wied (1858 in Branderslev – 1914) a Danish writer, a satirical critic of society in his time
