= Sigrid Kähler =

Danish ceramist and painter

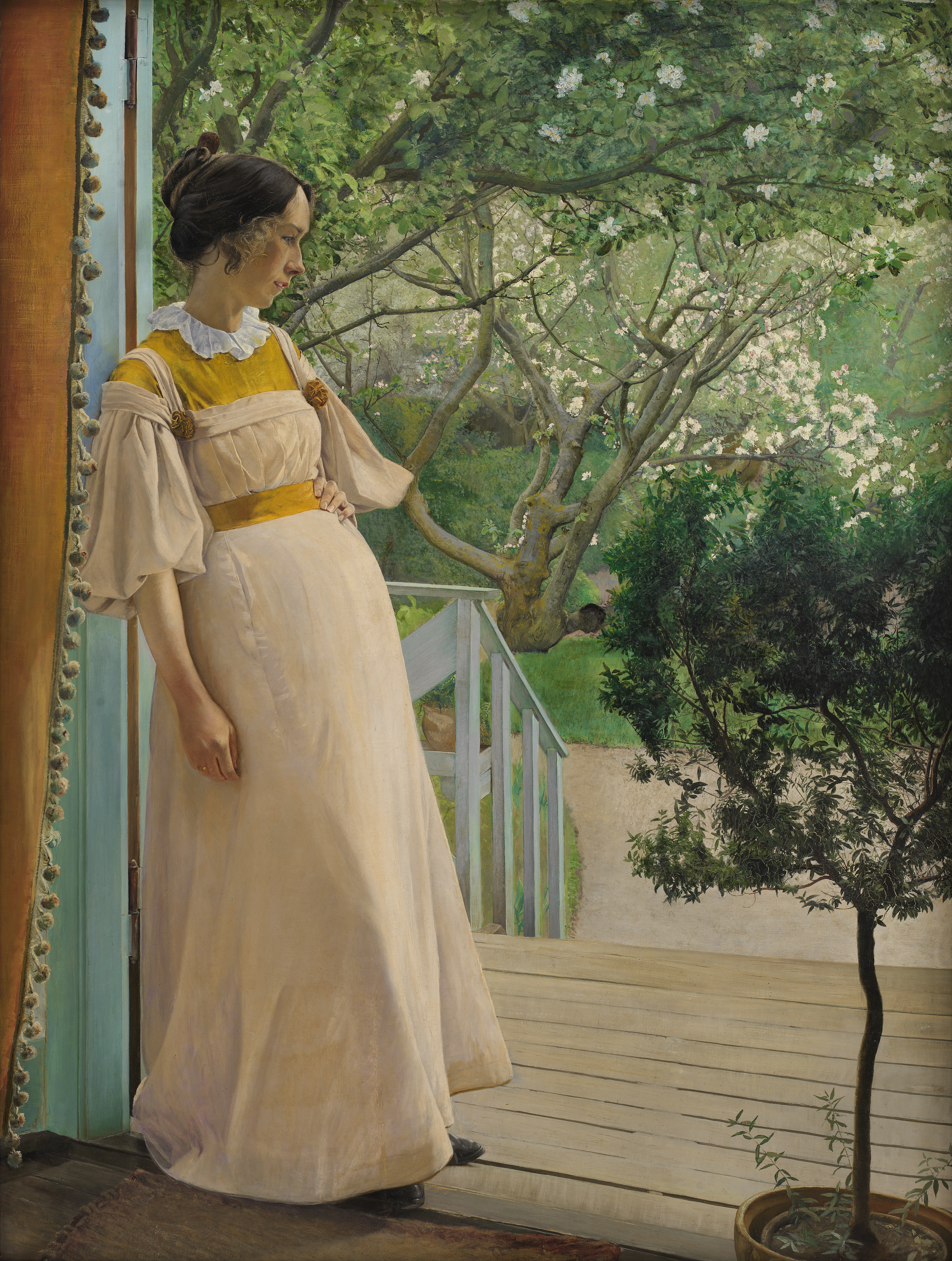
Sigrid Kähler as depicted by her husband L.A. Ring in the painting "In the garden door. The artist's wife" (1897)

Sigrid Kähler, also Sigrid Andersen Ring, (12 May 1874 – 9 May 1923) was a Danish ceramist and painter. Through her father, the ceramist Herman A. Kähler, she met the painter L. A. Ring. After their marriage in 1896, she inspired many of his works. Although she spent most of her time as a mother and housewife, she continued to paint occasionally and decorated ceramics. Her work together with that of her husband was exhibited in Ordrupgaard in 2017.

== Early life ==
Born in Næstved on 12 May 1874, Sigrid Kähler was the eldest of the six children of the ceramist Herman August Kähler (1846–1917) and Jansine Elisabeth Christine Berg (1848–1901). The others were Herman Hans Christian (1876), Hedevig (1878), Ebba (1880), Elisabeth (1882) and Stella (1886). She learnt to paint in her father's workshop where she decorated ceramics.

== Marriage and family ==
It was there she met L.A. Ring. They married in 1896 when he was twice as old as his 21-year-old bride. They had three children: Ghitta (1899), Anders (1900) and Ole (1902).

She had a very positive influence on her husband whose works exhibited a new phase of warmth and optimism. Most of his works were based on Sigrid, their three children and interiors of their home. Following her marriage, Sigrid spent most of her time raising her family rather than painting. Recently, however, some of her drawings of plants were discovered among Ring's photographs and correspondence. They include depictions of chicory, red clover and wild carrot, one of which is dated 1893. Her style was inspired by the architect Thorvald Bindesbøll. The works have been included in an exhibition of women's works at the Hirschsprung Art Museum.

Sigrid Kähler died of tuberculosis on 9 May 1923 in Roskilde. She is buried in St Ib's Graveyard.

== Image gallery ==
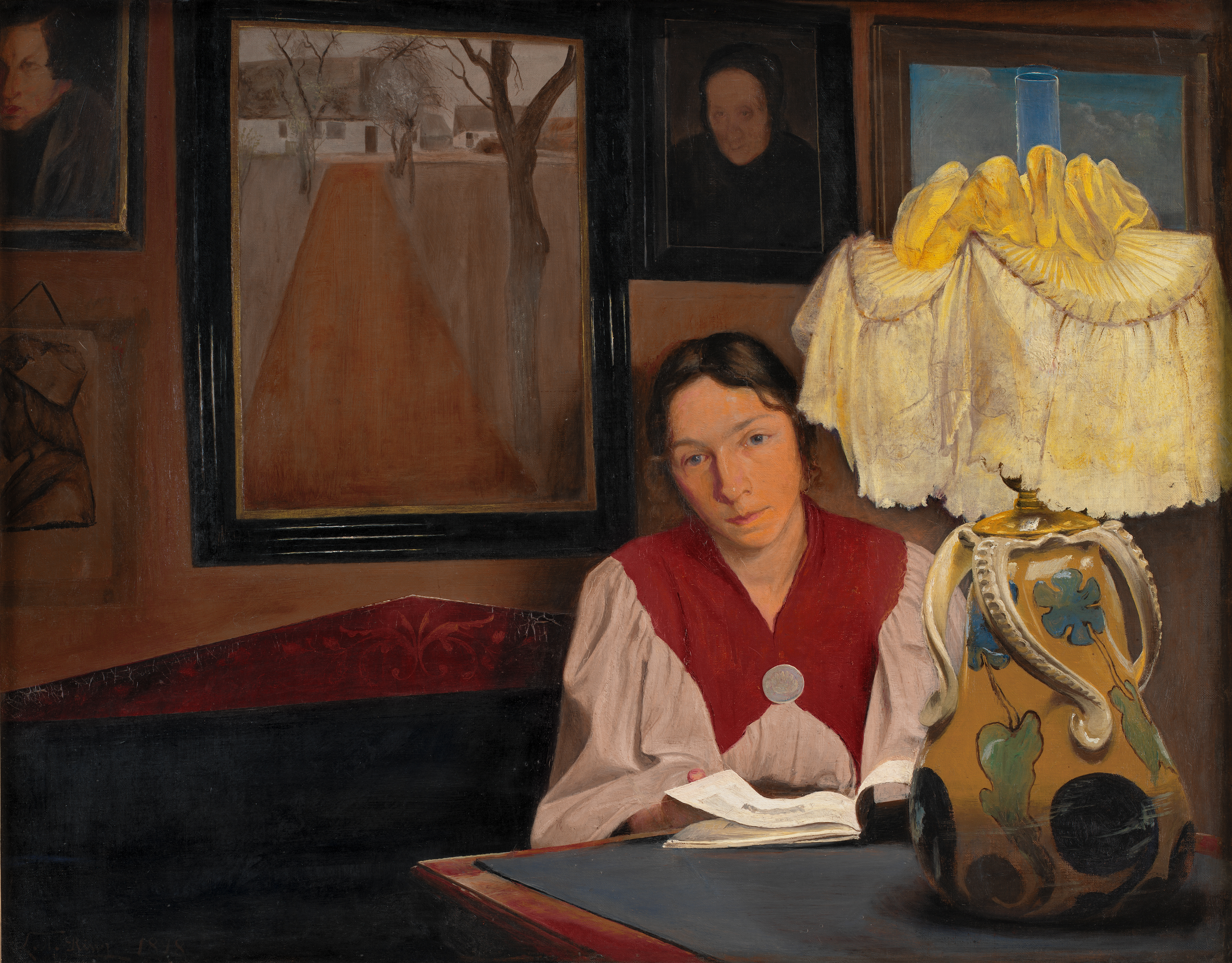
L. A. Ring: Lamplight: The Artist's Wife (1898)

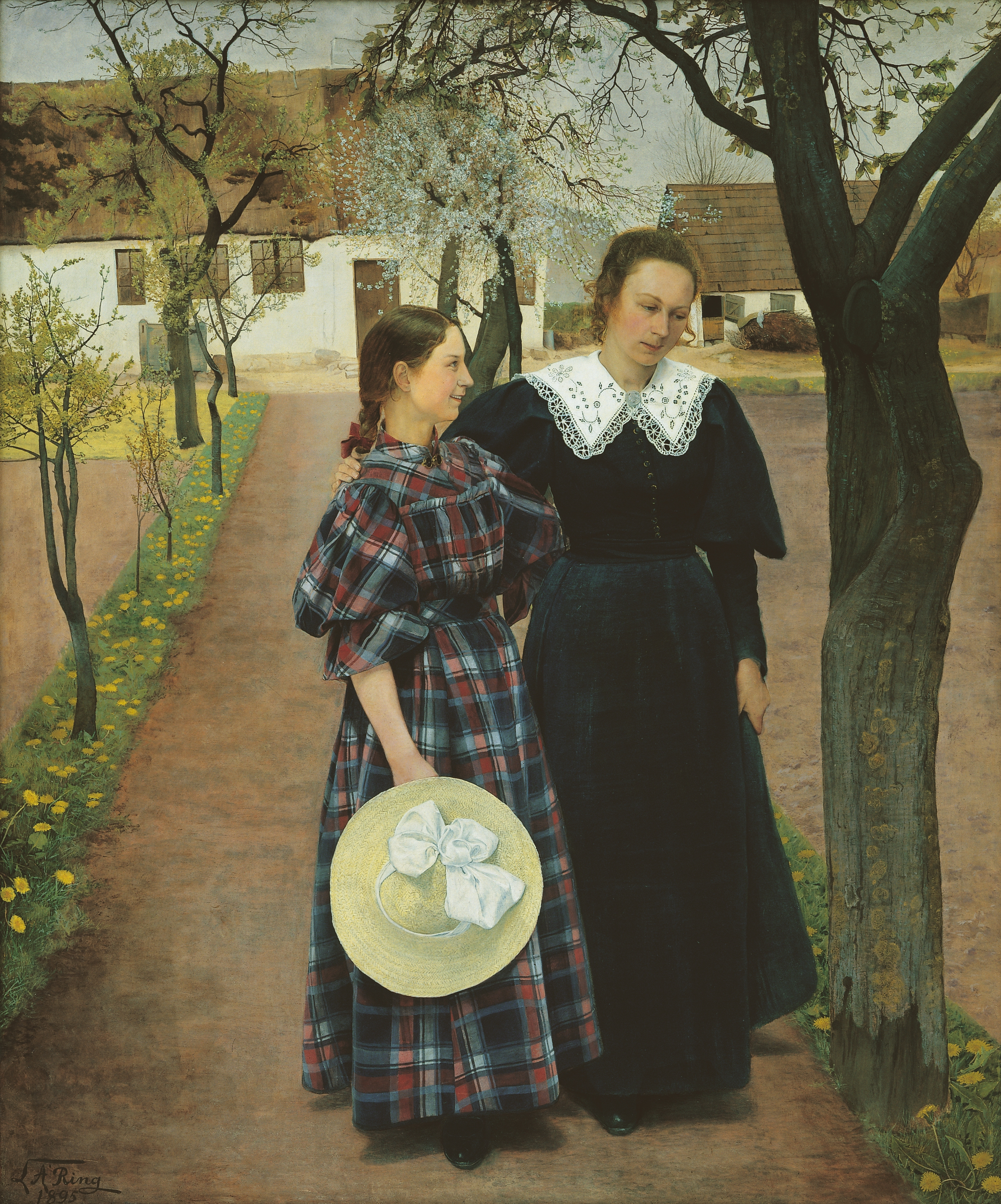
L. A. Ring: Spring (1895)
