= Kastellet (Roskilde) =

Coordinates: 55.6437°N 12.0731°E

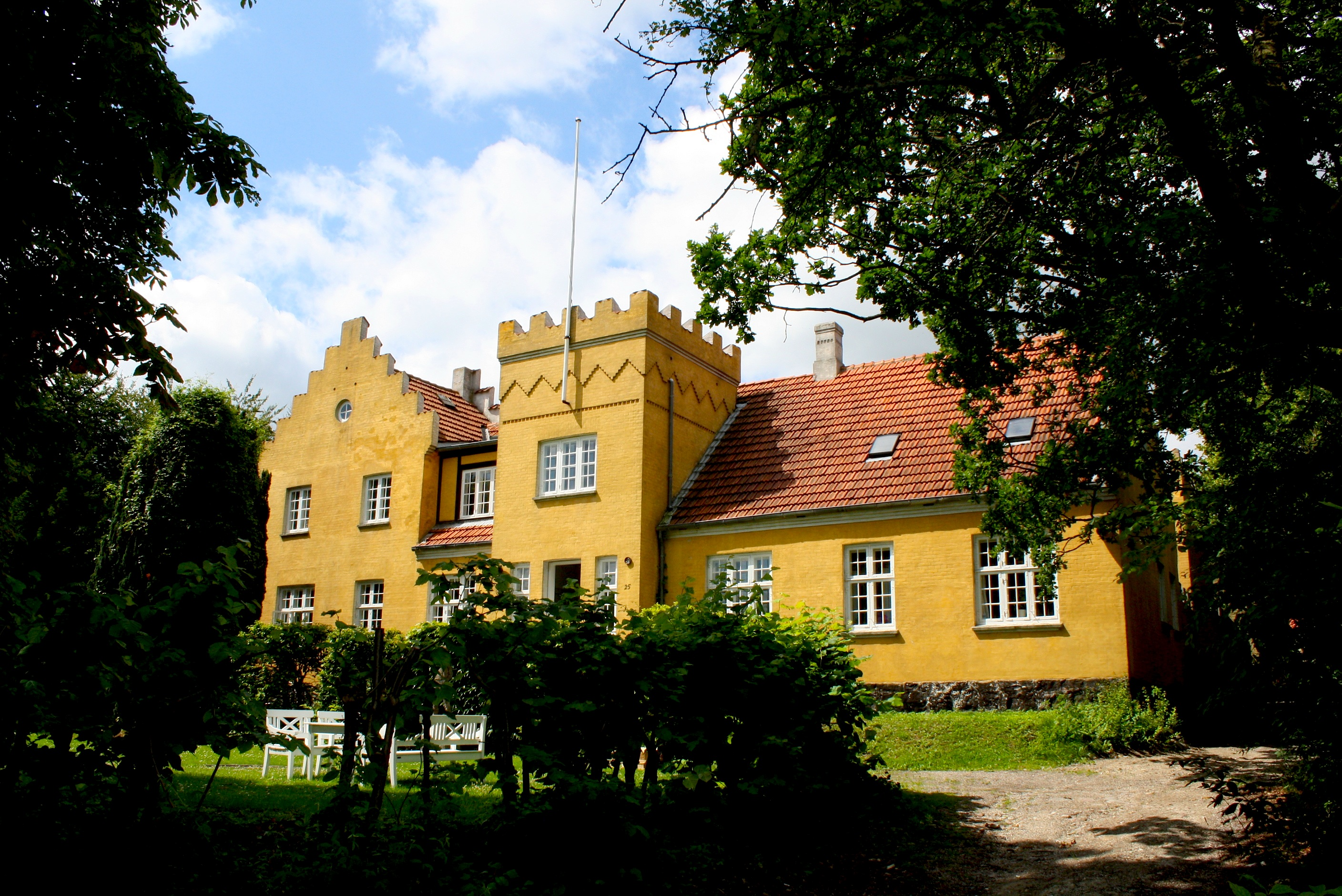
The Kastellet house in Roskilde

Kastellet (Danish: The Castle), a house in Roskilde, Denmark, is the former home of the Danish author and satirist Gustav Wied.

== History ==
The house was built to Wied's own design in 1900 with the proceeds from Første Violin, a comedy published in 1898. After a visit, his friend and colleague Walter Christmas referred to the house as "Kastellet" due to its castle-like architecture, and Wied instantly adopted the name, always using it in reference to his home thereafter.

== House and gardens ==
The property also includes a small half-timbered building known as the Widow Seat and an outbuilding known as the Gentlemen's Wing, connecting to a garden wall.

Both the buildings, the garden and a memorial grove with 28 memorials were listed by the Danish Heritage Agency in 1996.

== See also ==
- L. A. Ring House
