= Karl Hansen Reistrup =

Danish sculptor, illustrator and ceramist (1863–1929)

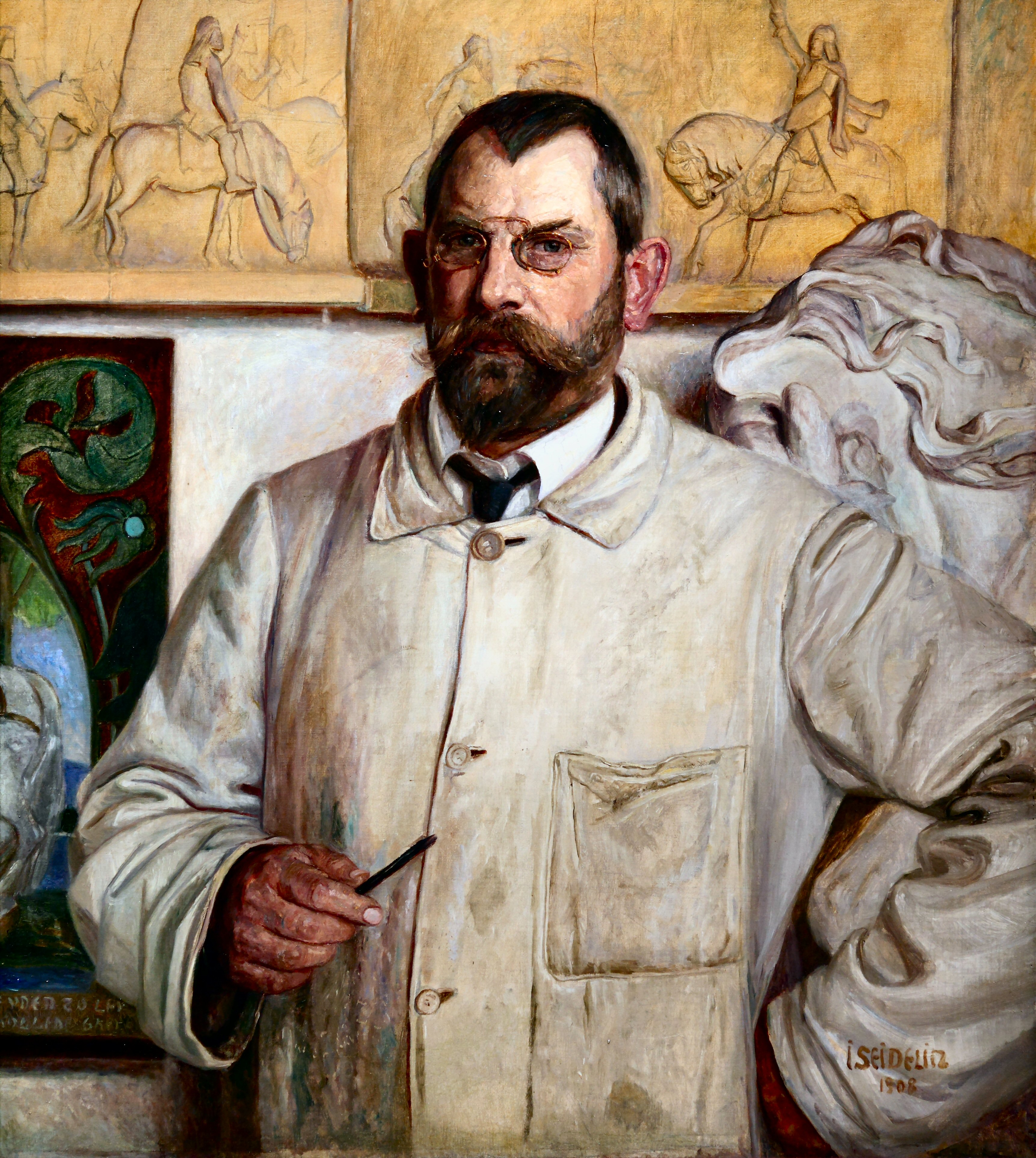
Karl Hansen Reistrup painted by Ingeborg Seidelin (1908)

Volmerslaget (King Valdemar in 1219 Battle of Lyndanisse; wall chart on paper—lithograph by Hansen Reistrup (1894)

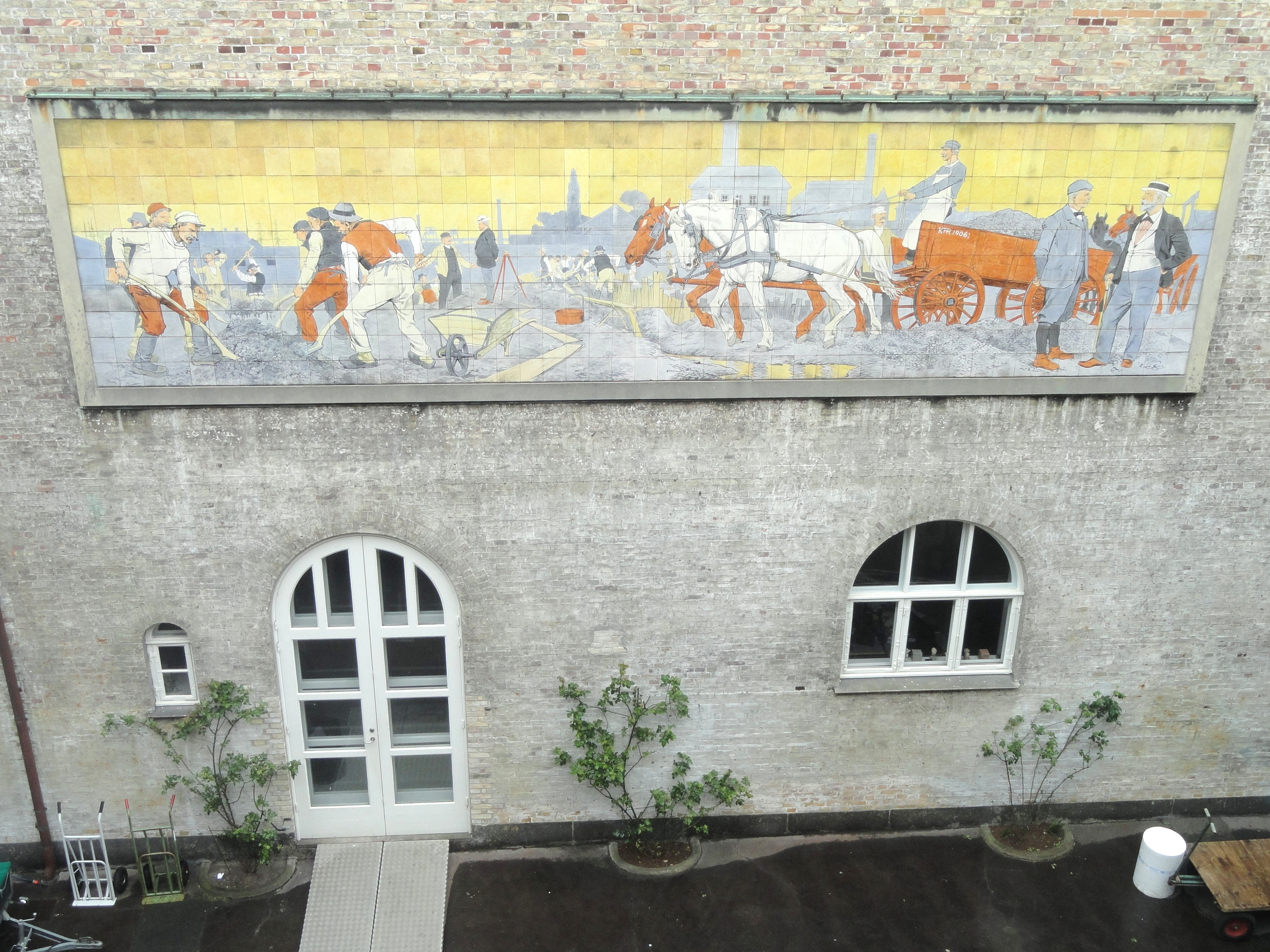
Hansen Reistrup's tiled frieze at Ny Carlsberg Glypotek (1906)

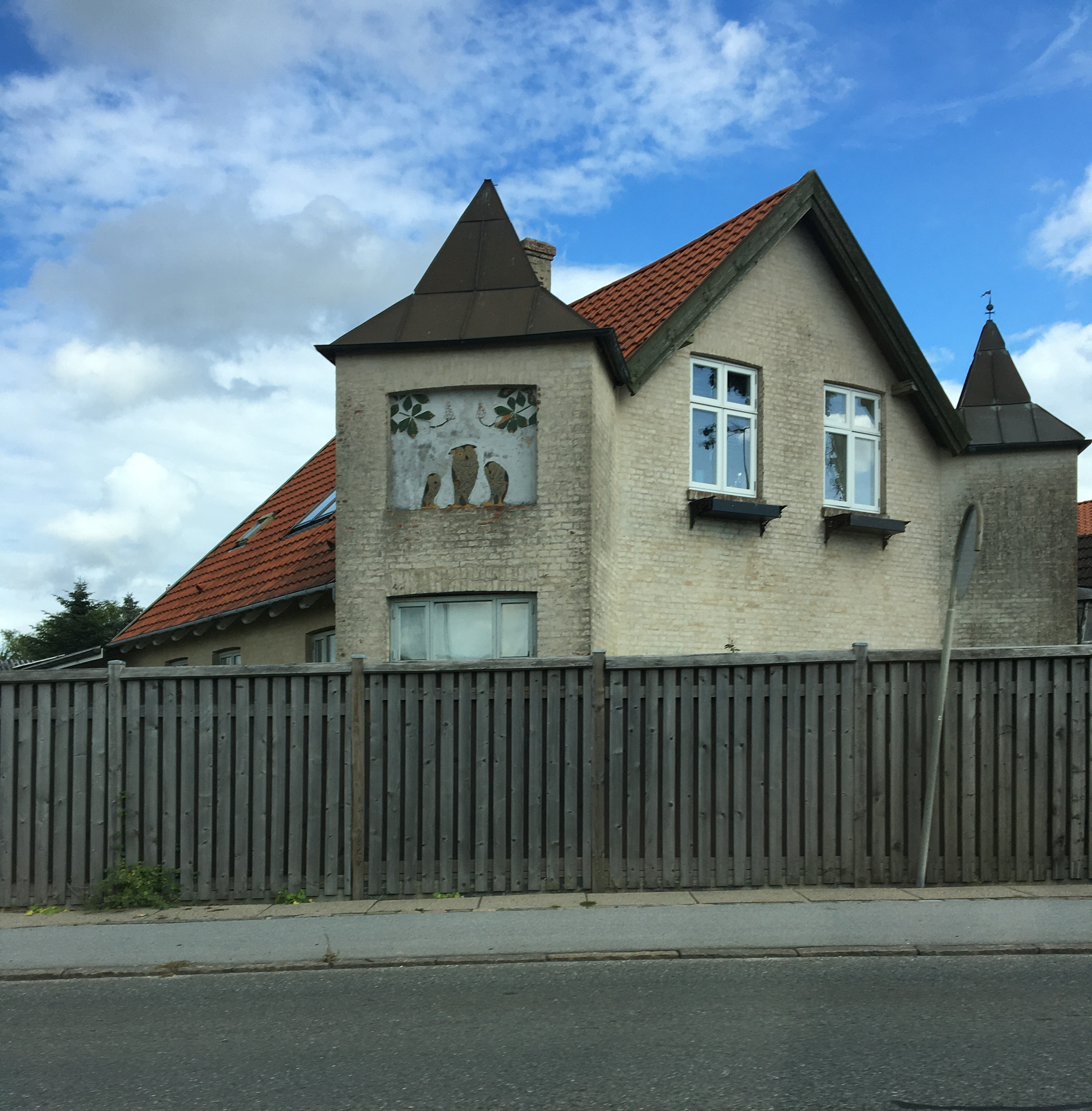
Karl Hansen Reistrup's home in Næstved.

Frederik Karl Kristian Hansen Reistrup (22 April 1863 – 18 March 1929) was a Danish sculptor, illustrator and ceramist. Reistrup is remembered for his important contribution to ceramics in particular for the ceramics he produced for Herman A. Kähler's pottery factory in Næstved.

== Biography ==
Born at Valby, he studied ceramics while attending the Copenhagen Technical College in preparation for training under Carl Ferdinand Andersen at the Royal Danish Academy of Fine Arts (1881–82). He also attended the Académie Julian in Paris under Henri Chapu from 1885.

After apprenticeships at the Kongelige Porcelainsfabrik and at the Manufacture nationale de Sèvres, he joined Herman A. Kähler at his ceramics factory in Næstved in 1888 where he became artistic director. He produced many successful designs, especially for vases and jugs, often finished in the ruby lustre glaze known as Kähler red. He also decorated a number of buildings, producing friezes for the Aarhus Theatre (1900), Marselisborg (1902) and Ny Carlsberg Glyptotek (1902).

Later he conducted artistic activity from his private address on Reistrupvej in Næstved. From around 1910 he created patriotic scenes of horses and battles from the wars of the First and Second Schleswig Wars including Rytterfægtningen ved Vorbasse (1892) and Affæren ved Høien kro (1919). He also worked as an illustrator in the same sphere. Additionally he illustrated the works of novelist and poet Bernhard Severin Ingemann.

== Personal life ==
In 1890, he married Johanne Katrine Hansine Jonasson (1865–1949). Their son, Urban Hansen-Reistrup (1893–1973) was an architect who was mainly active in Næstved. Karl Hansen Reistrup died at Copenhagen and was buried at the old churchyard in Næstved.

== Literature ==
- Anderson, Robert; Mitchell, Edna (15 December 2010). From Folk Art to Modern Design in Ceramics: Ethnographic Adventures in Denmark and Mexico 1975-1978 Updated 2010. iUniverse. pp. 138–. ISBN 978-1-4502-6743-4.
