= Herman A. Kähler =

Danish ceramic designer and manufacturer (1846–1917)

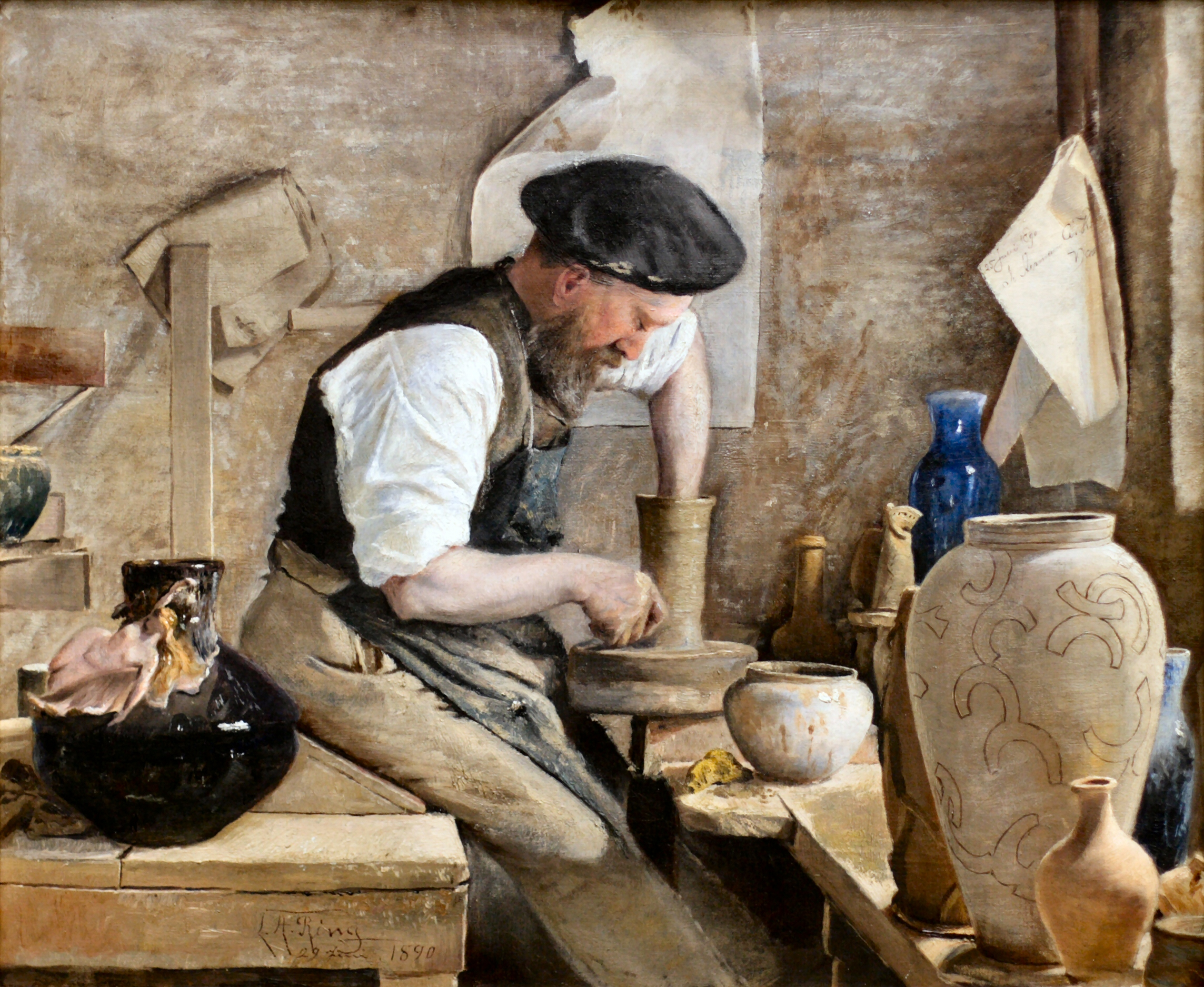
Herman Kähler in his Workshop, painting by L.A. Ring (1890)

Herman August Kähler, usually known as Herman A. Kähler, (6 March 1846 – 16 November 1917) was a Danish ceramic designer and manufacturer who ran the Kähler ceramic factory (Kählers Keramiske Værksted) in Næstved, Denmark. His daughter Sigrid married the painter L.A. Ring.

== Early life ==
Kähler was the son of Joachim Christian Herman Kähler (1808-1884) from the Duchy of Holstein who established a pottery workshop in Næstved in 1839. Herman attended the Technical School in Copenhagen (1864–65) while studying privately under Herman Wilhelm Bissen. Thereafter he travelled to Germany, Switzerland and Paris, returning to Næstved at the end of 1867.

== Career ==
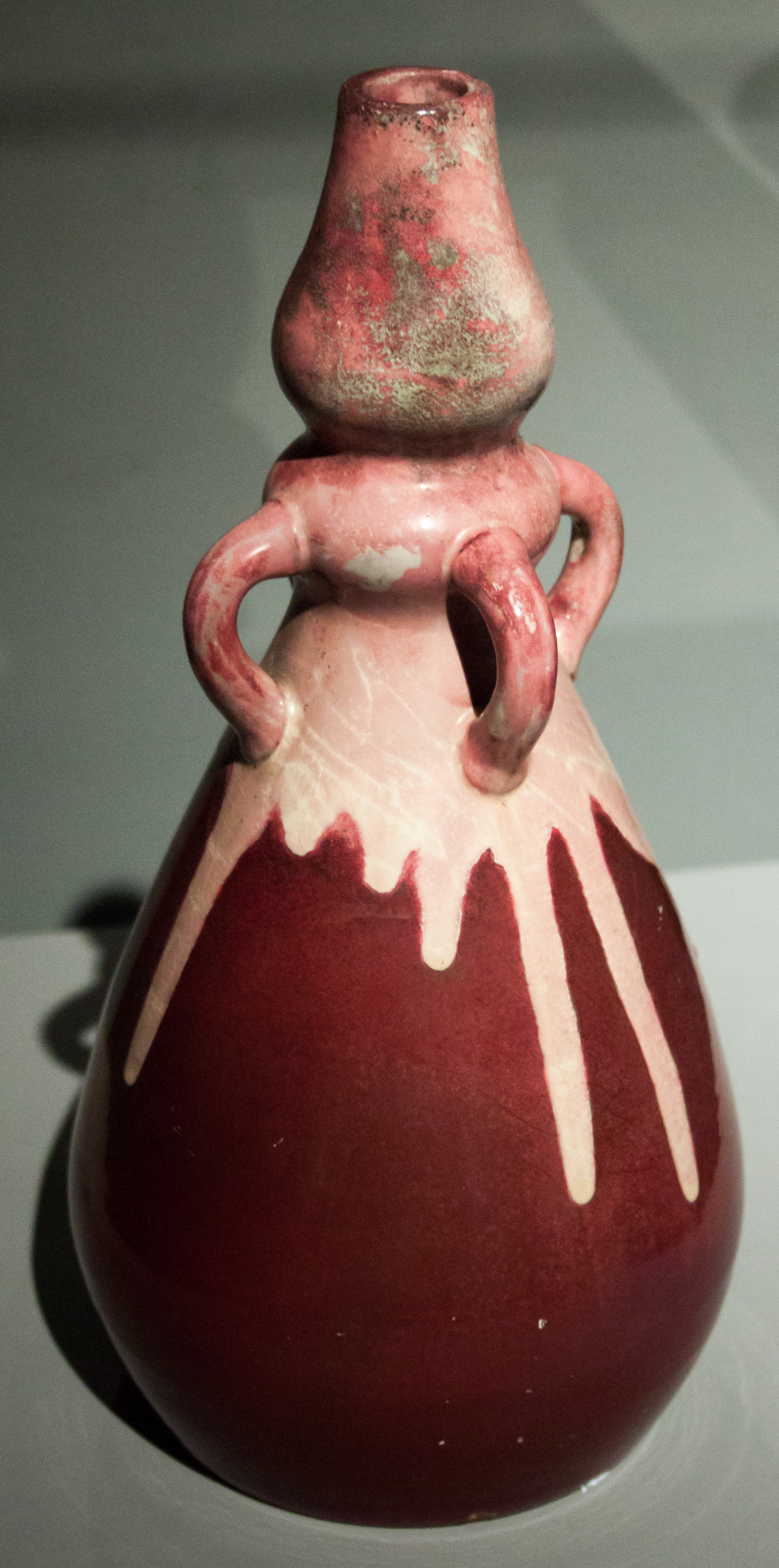
Four-handled Kähler vase with crackle glaze (1900)

Together with his younger brother Carl Frederik Kähler, he took over the running of the factory in 1872. Carl became responsible for producing faience while Herman specialized in manufacturing tiled stoves. In 1875, after Carl withdrew, Herman built a new factory on the town's outskirts where he produced both stoves and pottery.

As a result of his collaboration with the artist Vilhelm Klein, Kähler became interested in obtaining the red lustre glaze known as maiolica which had been produced in Gubbio, Italy, in the 16th century. In 1888 he succeeded, developing the now famous ruby glaze known as Kähler red. The designer Karl Hansen Reistrup (1863–1929) soon joined the enterprise, assisting in the production of finely formed, artistically decorated items, especially vases. Thanks to Reistrup's designs, Kähler's ceramics achieved considerable success both at the Great Nordic Exhibition held in Copenhagen in 1888 and at the Exposition Universelle held the following year in Paris. A number of other artists began to design items for the Kähler factory, including Thorvald Bindesbøll, H. A. Brendekilde, L.A. Ring and Svend Hammershøi. Their contributions further enhanced the firm's international success.

Kähler died in Næstved in 1917. His son Herman Hans Christian Kähler (1876-1940) who had taken over management of the factory in 1901 continued to run the enterprise.
