= Næstved Museum =

Coordinates: 55°13′56″N 11°45′30″E

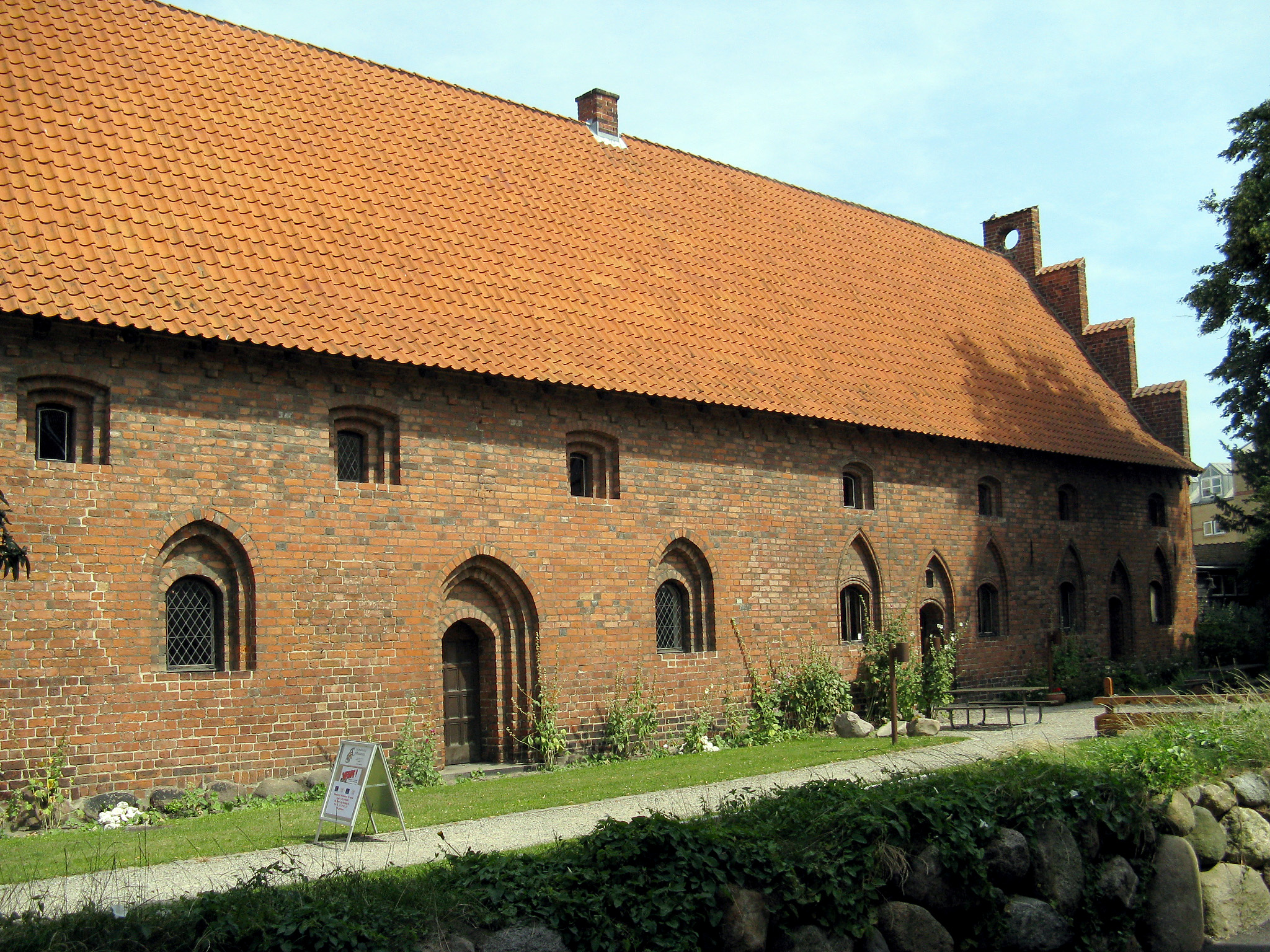
Helligåndshuset housing Næstved Museum

Næstved Museum is located in Helligåndshuset (House of the Holy Spirit) in Næstved, central Zealand, Denmark. Its collections trace the development of the area from the last ice age to the present. Highlights include an extensive collection of textiles and exhibitions of artefacts from the Kähler Ceramics Factory and from the Holmegaard Glass Factory.

== History and overview ==
Næstved Museum was established in 1917 and was officially recognized by the national authorities in 1930. Geographically it covers the area of Næstved Municipality as extended by the communal reform of 2007. It is divided into two main centres, Helligåndshuset on Ringstedgade to the north of the town centre, and Boderne, on Sct Peders Kirkeplads to the southwest.

=== Helligåndshuset ===
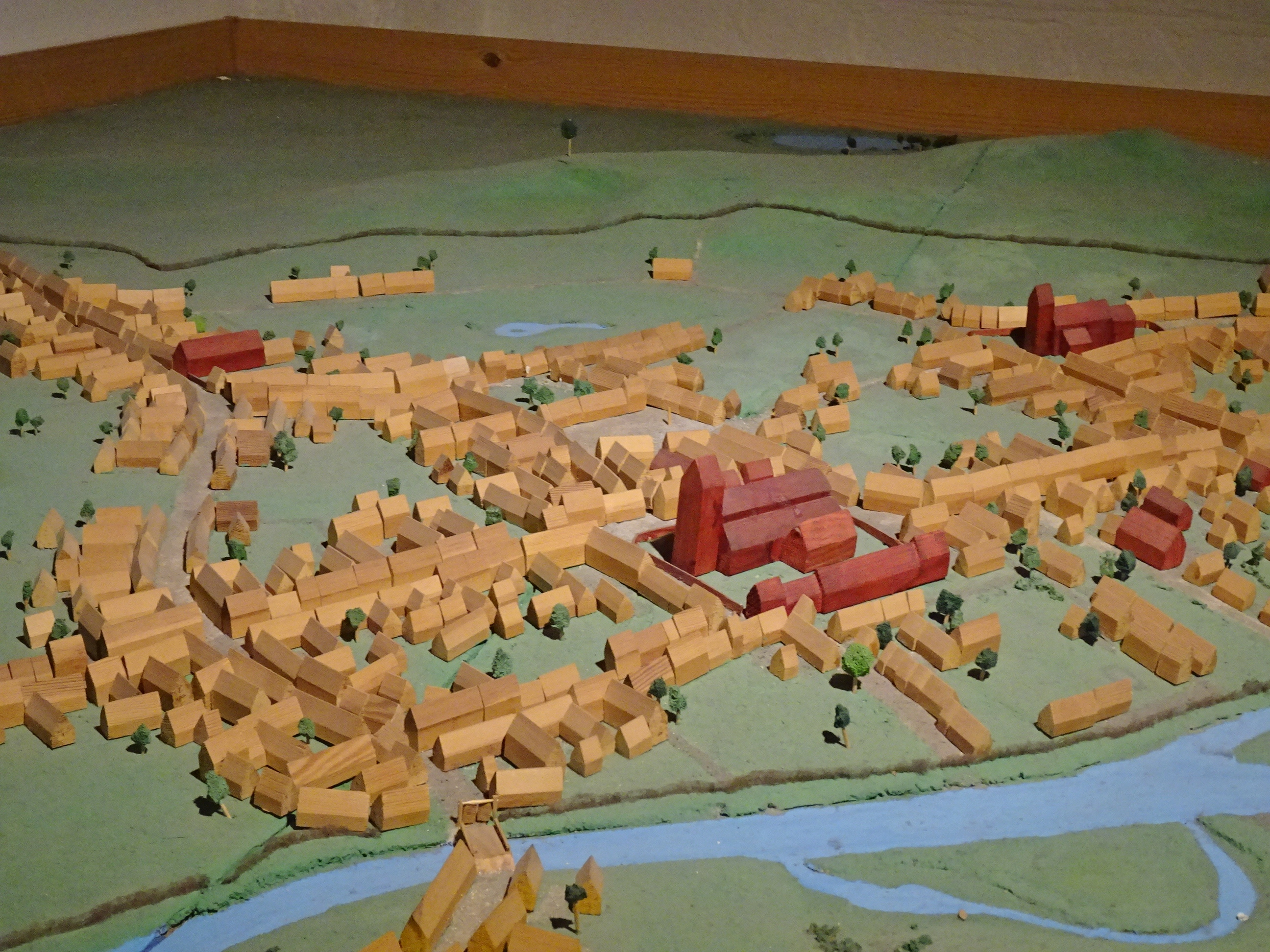
Museum model of Næstved c. 1600

The building which dates from the 15th century first consisted of a series of stone stalls which served as accommodation. In the early 16th century, Vor Frue Kirke (Church of Our Lady) was added to the west end. In 1804, the church was abandoned and its spires were removed. It then served both as a hospital and a workhouse where textiles were manufactured. The building was comprehensively restored in 1926-27 and has since housed collections belonging to the museum. There is a section devoted to the Middle Ages centred on artefacts found during archaeological excavations and another dealing with woodcarving in the town in the 16th and 17th centuries. There is a display covering the military presence in Næstved and a historical collection of clothing and textiles for men, women and children from both town and country.

=== Boderne ===
Originally used for accommodation, the Boderne complex was restored from 1969 to 1984. It now houses exhibitions related to Herman A. Kähler's ceramics factory and the Holmegård Glass Works. The development of the Kähler enterprise over four generations is shown in considerable detail in several rooms. Two rooms are devoted to Holmegård glass from the mid-19th century to the present day. Other displays cover silverware produced in the neighbourhood and ceramics from the whole of Denmark.

== Opening hours ==
The museum is open to the public, free of charge.

Helligåndshuset: Tuesday, Wednesday, Friday and Saturday: 10 am to 2 pm; Thursday: 10 am to 6 pm; Sunday: 1 pm to 4 pm

Boderne: Tuesday, Wednesday, Friday and Saturday: 10 am to 2 om

== Literature ==
- Andersen, Hans Jørgen. Næstved Museum. Boderne. Hans Jørgen Andersen i samarbejde med Næstved Museum.
