= Næstved =

- Town
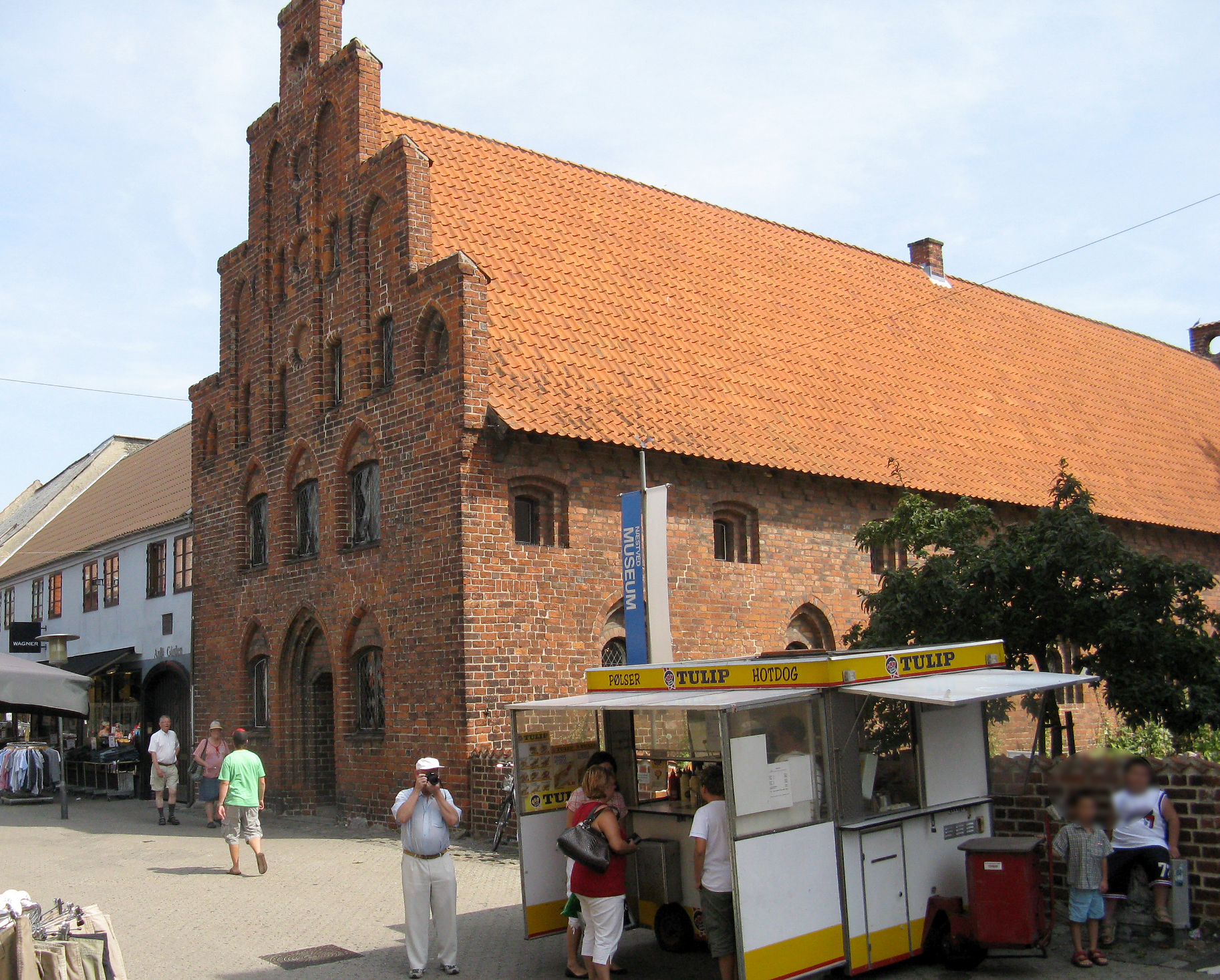
- Næstved Museum

- Coat of arms
- Motto: "South Zealand's capital"
- Næstved (lower center) in Denmark Næstved (Denmark Region Zealand)
- Coordinates: 55°13′30″N 11°45′30″E
- Country: Denmark
- Region: Zealand (Sjælland)
- Municipality: Næstved

Government
  - Mayor: Carsten Rasmussen

Area
  - Urban: 22.2 km^{2} (8.6 sq mi)
- Elevation: 16 m (52 ft)

Population (January 1st 2026)
  - Urban: 45,522
  - Urban density: 2,050/km^{2} (5,310/sq mi)
  - Gender: 22,099 males and 23,423 females
- Demonym: Næstveder
- Time zone: UTC+1 (CET)
  - Summer (DST): UTC+2 (CEST)
- Postal code: 4700
- Area code: (+45) 55
- Website: naestved.dk

Næstved (Danish pronunciation: [ˈnestve̝ð]) is a town in the municipality of the same name, located in the southern part of the island of Zealand in Denmark.

Næstved has several adult education centers, five elementary schools - and has at least one of each type of the four upper-second-level education centers. The city has the largest high school in Denmark, Næstved Gymnasium & HF.

== History ==
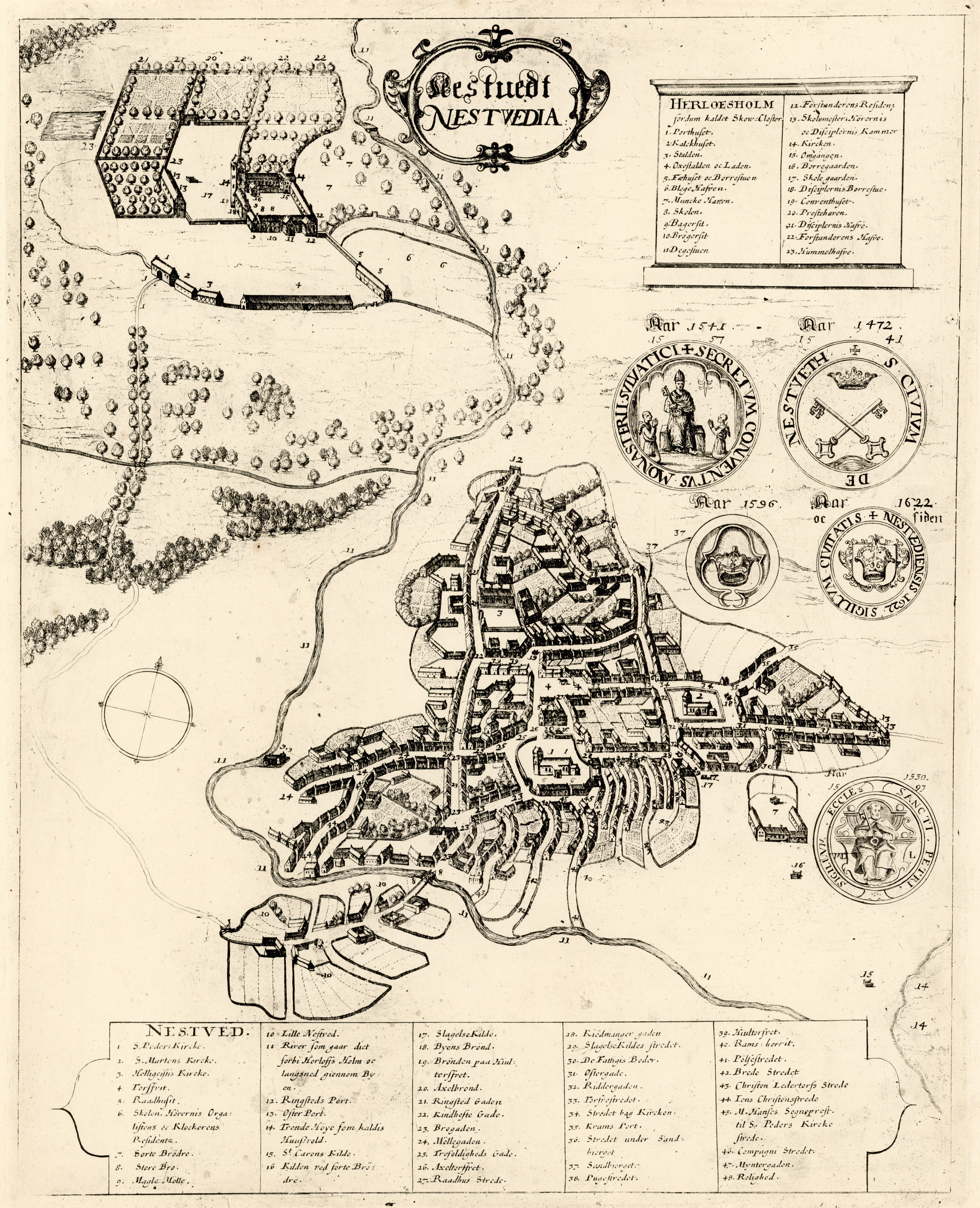
Map of the town from 1677.

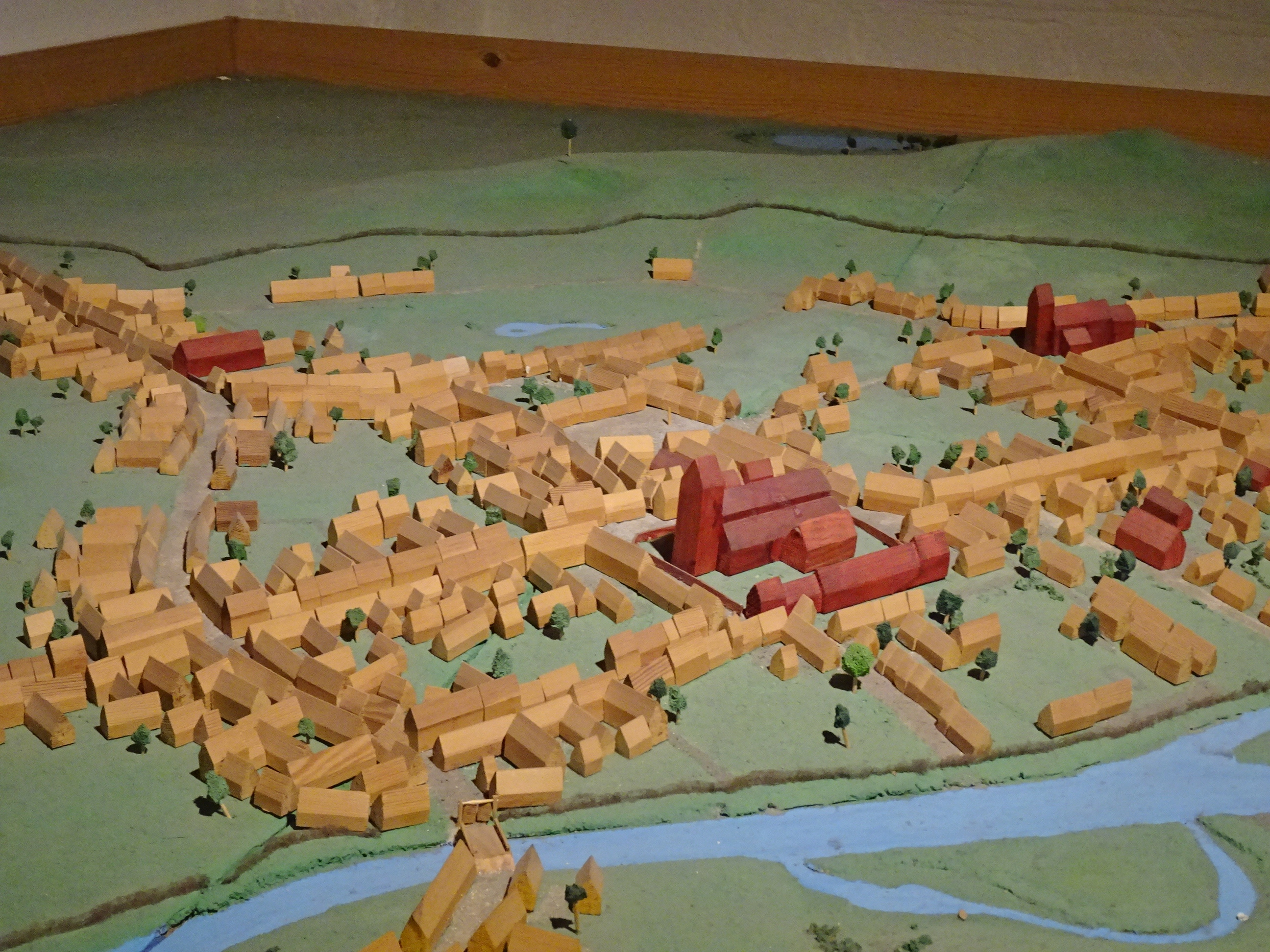
Diorama inside the Næstved Museum showing Næstved as it appeared circa 1600.

Næstved has roots as far back as 400-500 BC. Archaeological material from this period has been found in the soil under Næstved, and tells of human life here long before the Viking era.

The name of the city, Næstved, derives from two words: Næs and Tved. Tved means "cleared land" or "cleared wood" (as "thwaite" in English toponyms), and refers to the city's origin in the woods of southern Zealand, on the banks of the Suså. "Næs" is the Danish word for a small peninsula (as "ness" in English toponyms), and probably refers to the city's placing on the peninsulas Ydernæs, Grimstrup Næs, and Appenæs.

In 1135, Benedictine monks received Saint Peter's Church and surrounding land in order to found St. Peter's Priory. This is seen as the foundation of the town of Næstved, although the town appears to have existed already at that time, being both big and important to the region.

== Culture ==
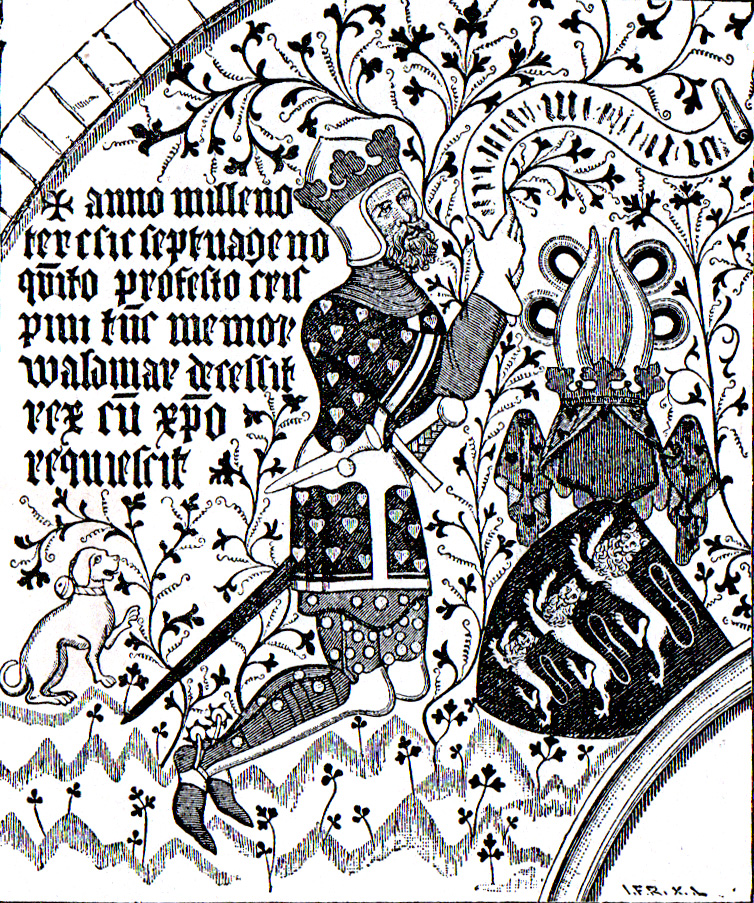
Valdemar IV of Denmark (Valdemar Atterdag) shown on a fresco in Saint Peter's Church in Næstved (Sankt Peders Kirke).

Næstved has various museums, concert-venues, theaters and exhibitions of all kinds during the year.

=== Churches ===
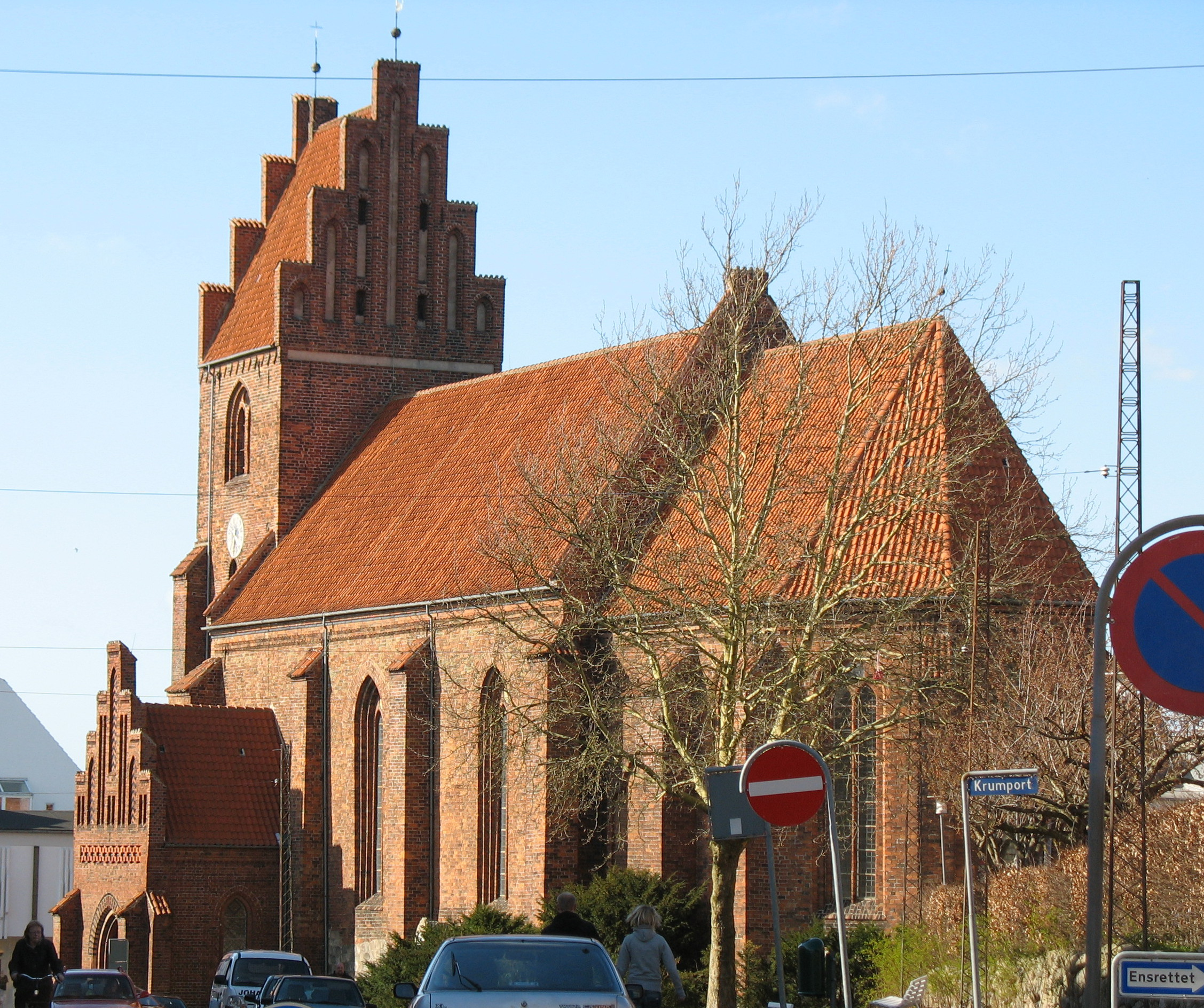
St Martin's Church

Næstved has five Danish National Churches: St. Martin's Church, St. Peter's Church, Saint John's Church, Herlufsholm Church, and Holsted Church. There are other churches in the town, such as Sjølundkirken.

=== Music and stage arts ===
Grønnegades Kaserne Kulturcenter was opened in 2002 in what used to be military barracks. It is in the center of the city, only five minutes walk away from the station. Denmark's top artists perform here, along with various names from abroad. Amongst the best-known foreign artists to have visited Næstved over the last few years are Electric Light Orchestra (ELO), Beth Hart, Runrig, and Modern Talking.

In recent years, various theatres have emerged in Næstved, culminating with the creation of an "Egns Teater" - a local theatre - in 2006. Performances by talented local artists add to Næstved's position as a cultural stronghold on Zealand outside Copenhagen.

"Studenternes Hus" downtown (House of Students) is also a widely known and frequently used venue for local and national acts, as well as the occasional international acts.

=== Museums ===
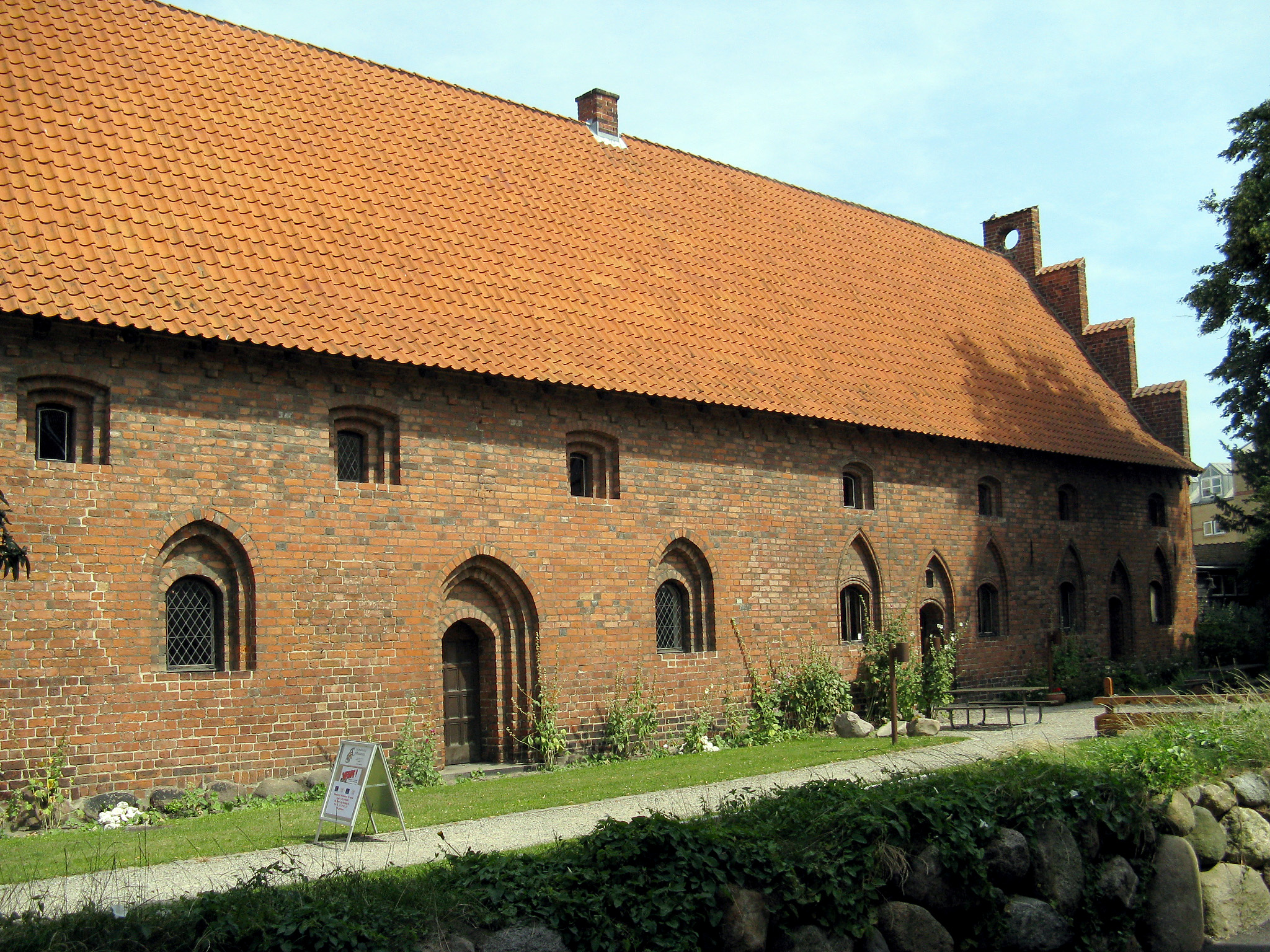
Helligåndshuset housing Næstved Museum

Næstved has a range of museums of local importance. In the city centre, Næstved Museum offers the full story of Næstved - from the very first settlements till this day. In Stenboderne, near St. Peter's Church, a collection of ancient findings are on show, including pottery, armory and more.

Næstved Museum has exhibits covering the development of Kähler Ceramics and Holmegaard Glass. It is open to visitors every day except Monday. There are also interesting exhibits on textiles, toys and silverware. The museum consists of two separate buildings: Helligåndshuset on Ringstedgade to the north of the central square and Boderne on Sct. Peters Kirkeplads to the southwest.

== Politics ==
On 1 January 2007, the size and population of the municipality of Næstved increased, as the government decided to merge four smaller municipalities with the municipality of Næstved. Næstved emerged with nearby Fuglebjerg, Fladså, Holmegaard and Suså, increasing population in the municipality of Næstved to more than 80.000. That made Næstved the second-largest town on Zealand, only outranked by the capital, Copenhagen.

Experienced mayor, Henning Jensen, led the city through the merger, and stayed head of the city council, with the four mayors from the other merged municipalities taking place as members of the council. Henning Jensen remained mayor of Næstved until 2011.

=== Political history ===
Traditionally, the Social Democratic Party has had the majority of seats in the City Council of Næstved. Today, they also have the most seats (⅓ of the seats with support from other leftist parties).

The mayors of the town have been.

Name	Political party	Period
Henning Jensen	Social Democrats	2007 (1988)- May 2011
Carsten Rasmussen	Social Democrats	May 2011 – present

Political party	Seats				
Political party	2001	2005	2009	2013	2017
Social Democrats	11	17	11	14	13
Danish People's Party	1	1	3	3	2
Venstre	5	9	9	8	9
Red-Green Alliance	0	0	0	1	1
SF	1	1	4	1	1
Conservative People's Party	2	2	2	3	2
Danish Social Liberal Party	0	1	2	1	2
Liberal Alliance	-	-	0	0	0
Christian Democrats	0	0	0	0	0
The Alternative	-	-	-	-	0
Forny Næstved	1	0	0	0	-
The New Right	-	-	-	-	0
All together	21	31	31	31	31

== International Cities of Friendship ==
The Nordic International Cities of Friendship project was initiated in 1939, involving cities in Denmark, Norway and Sweden. Later on Finland also became part of the network, with Iceland and the independent regions of Åland, Greenland and Faroe Islands to follow.

Næstved entered the project in 1947.

Næstved's Cities of Friendship as per 1.1.2007:

- Bessastaðahreppur - Iceland
- Álftanes – Iceland
- Gävle - Sweden
- Chalon-sur-Saône – France
- Sopot – Poland
- Gjøvik - Norway
- Rauma - Finland
- Sárospatak - Hungary
- Caracal - Romania
- Feuchtwangen - Germany

== Urban life ==
Over the last 10 years, Næstved has developed into a more lively city than before. The trend of going out to cafés struck Næstved in the beginning of this century, and today, the town offers several cafés in the City Centre.

Also, the population has increased heavily, and actually Næstved is the second fastest growing city in Denmark, only out-performed by Denmark's second largest city Aarhus.

The traffic in down-town Næstved can be very congested at times. New roads around the city has solved part of this problem, but the traffic can still be heavy, specially around 8 a.m. and 4 p.m.

The city received a new library in 2005, just beside another new institution: Grønnegade Cultural Center in the center of Næstved.

== Industries ==
(This section needs development)

Near the sea, with the harbour in the city centre, Næstved was traditionally a city of industry. In recent years, though, industry in the city centre has decreased, as production has moved to the outskirts of the city - primarily on Ydernæs.

Among the companies in Næstved are Emerson Electric and Ropox A/S.

=== Novenco ===
Næstved's largest industry, Novenco, develops and manufactures heating, ventilation, air-conditioning and refrigeration solutions for land and marine applications, along with numerous other products including fire-fighting products and systems.

In 1999, Novenco was sold to York International Inc., and had its name changed to York Novenco. In 2006, however, York Novenco was acquired by Dania Capital (a Danish investment company), who changed its name back to Novenco once again.

=== Ardagh Glass ===
The major glass bottle company Based in Fensmark Is the largest private employer in the municipality with about 400 employees manufacturing bottles for soft drinks and beers among its most common products. It is part of the Irish Ardagh Group and until recently the fears was that the factory would be closed due to economic issues that today have been resolved and the factory is doing well again.

== Næstved Harbour ==
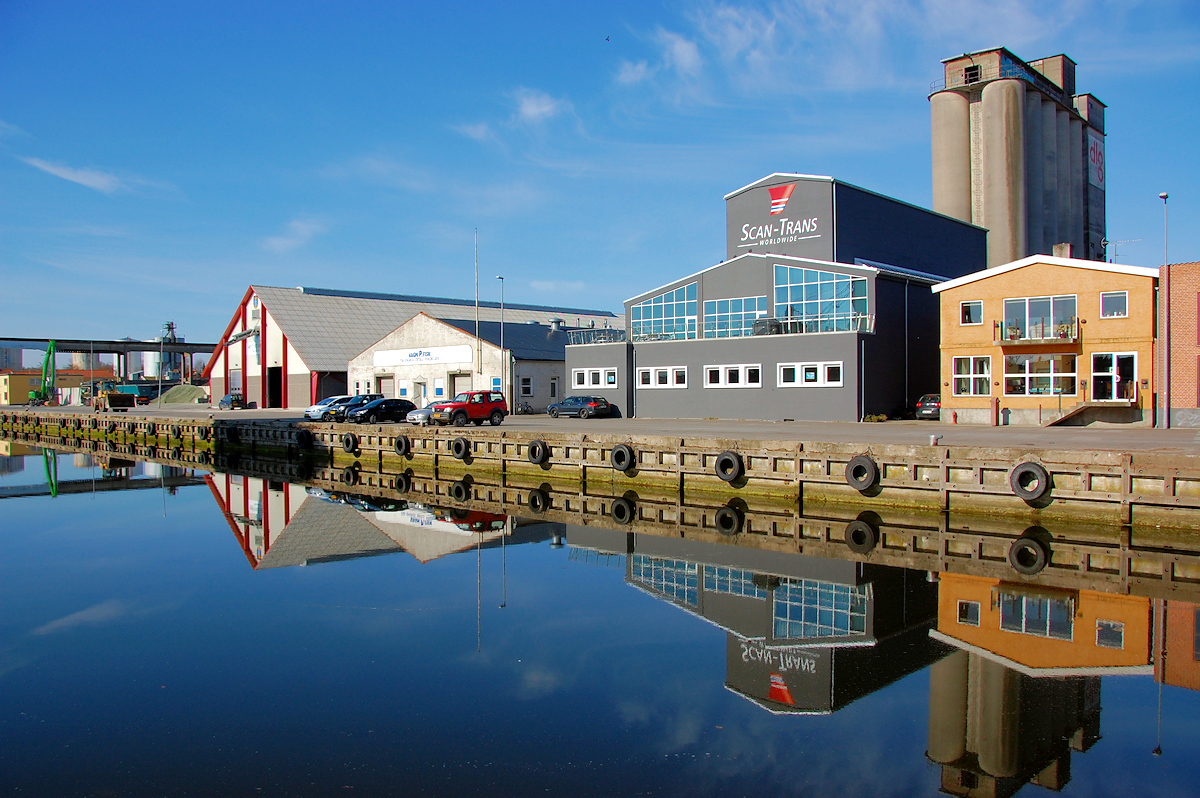
Næstved Harbour

Næstved Harbour is in the middle of the city and in a central location in Denmark, near to Storebæltsbroen (The Great Belt Bridge), and the Fehmarn connection can be reached within an hour by road.

One of the biggest stone plants in the country for the refinement of seabed materials is situated at Næstved Harbour. One of the reasons why the company chose to set up at Næstved Harbour was because it would be possible for their annual production of around 120 000 tonnes of material to be sent more quickly to customers - and because Næstved Harbour has exactly the kind of storage capacity required, regardless of whether goods are to be stored for a long time or just briefly.

== Attractions ==
Næstved and the surrounding area offer a wide variety of attractions for all ages. The town is especially rich in Medieval architecture; Old Town Hall is from about 1450, Helligåndshuset i Næstved dates around 1500, Boderne is terraced buildings which have contained shops, and the oldest are from about 1400, Kompagnihuset is from 1493 and the two timber-framed buildings Apostelhuset and Ridderhuset is both the beginning for the 1600th century.

The local museum, Næstved Museum, is housed in Helligåndshuset and offers en exhibition of archeological findings from Næstved and the nearby area from the Stone Ages until moderne times.

=== Suså ===
The Suså River is Denmark's third longest river and flows through Næstved. After the demolition of a huge parking lot above it, the Suså has recently become more visible in the city. The Suså is surrounded on both sides by the Herlufsholm Forrest from the city center to Herlufsholm. Visitors are able to walk down both sides of the Suså, and enjoy both the forest, the river, and Herlufsholm Boarding school.

Fishing and canoeing are allowed on the river.

=== BonBon Land ===
Næstved is home to the amusement park BonBon-Land located at Holme Olstrup, just 10 minutes from the city center. The park has increased dramatically in size over recent years, and was in 2012 among the 20 most visited sights in all of Denmark.

Recently, a new feature has been added to the amusement park in Holme Olstrup. It is called Fantasy World, and used to be located in Ringsted. It has now been bought by BonBon Land, and is located immediately next to it. Fantasy World features a huge exhibition of Santa Claus, his home, his workshop and all of his little helpers.

=== Herlufsholm Kostskole ===
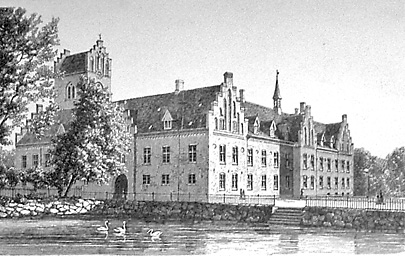
Herlufsholm boarding School

Herlufsholm Boarding School is located in the old Herlufsholm Kloster, on the bank of the Suså just outside the town of Næstved. For centuries students have attended the school, which enjoys a very respectable reputation. Today, the boarding school attracts students from all levels in the society, but earlier the school was more or less a high-society-only school.

The school houses various collections of scientific materials.

=== Holmegaard Glass Factory ===
Holmegaard Glass Factory is a glass company located in the village of Holmegaard, just outside Næstved.

=== Gavnø Castle ===
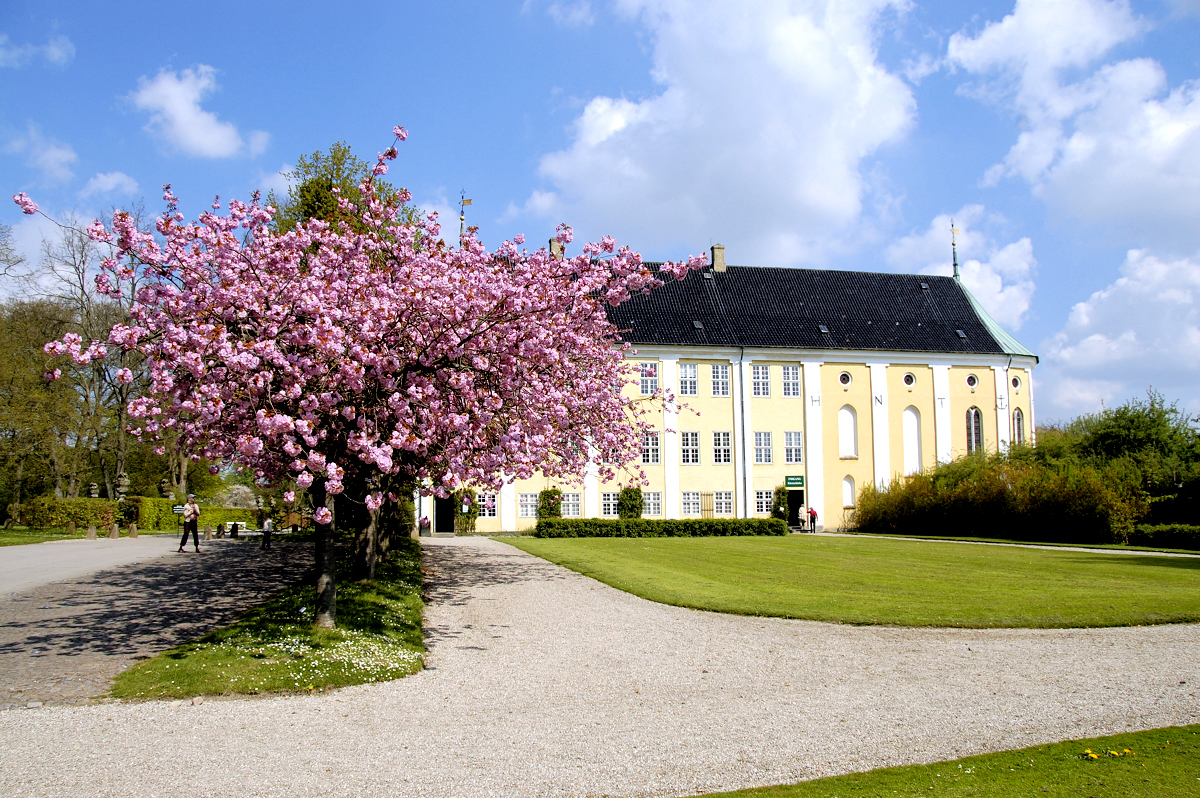
Gavnø Castle

Gavnø Castle is located on the island of Gavnø near Næstved. The castle is known for its tulips and a large collection of paintings.

Today, the castle is owned by baron Otto Reedtz-Thott, and has been in the Reedtz-Thott family since 1737. The castle covers some 2,300 acres (9.3 km^{2}) of land, with 1,200 acres (4.9 km^{2}) of agriculture and 1,000 acres (4.0 km^{2}) of wood.

The castle has a vast variety of exhibitions during the year. The Gavnø Classic Autojumble is Denmark's largest exhibition of classic cars, and takes place every summer. Also there is a Christmas Market taking place in the gardens during two weekends in November, which is one of the largest in the country.

Art-, book-, hunting- and health-fairs also take place.

=== Kähler Ceramics ===
The history of "Kähler" has its beginning in 1839, when Herman Kähler took over an old pottery in Næstved, and founded the Kähler ceramic workshop.

The old pottery is still located downtown Næstved on "Kählersbakken", a ten-minute walk from the Axeltorv Square in the city centre.

== Commerce ==
=== Næstved Stor Center ===
In 1989, a large shopping mall was established on what was then the outskirts of the city. The mall is called Næstved Storcenter (Næstved Big Center), and houses over 80 shops. Clothing, Danish design and much more can be found here. The center also offers seven restaurants of various kinds, from Mexican cuisine to pizzas, and hamburgers. People from most of Zealand come here to shop, and the large warehouse, BILKA, attracts a lot of customers. Moreover, a large garden store is located inside the mall.

Næstved Storcenter is on the outer edge of the city, and is easily accessible by bus (from Næstved Station) and by train (Næstved Nord Station is a five-minute walk from the mall entrance).

=== Næstved Mega Center ===
Næstved Mega Center is located next to Næstved Storcenter. Næstved Megacenter contains about 10 stores, including electronics and baby wear shops.

=== Næstved City Centre ===
The heart of the city has a large pedestrian area for a place of its size.

Every Wednesday and Saturday there's a market in the city centre on "Axeltorv" (Axle Square) - a very old square, dating back to the founding of the city.

Næstved has always been a hub of trade and commerce. Even before the year 1274 Næstved enjoyed the status of being a royal market town, and the market square itself predates 1140. The two names – Axeltorv ("Axle Square") and Hjultorv ("Wheel Square") – tell us that the market wares arrived and were sold on wheels. Today, Næstved is known for its shopping centres and an attractive town environment full of specialist shops. Market days are still held on Axeltorv Wednesday and Saturday every week, and every year the town centre holds its own "City Night" (mostly held on Fridays). This event often features music and other kinda of Entertainment, the shops stay open late until 10pm.

== Transport ==
=== Railways ===
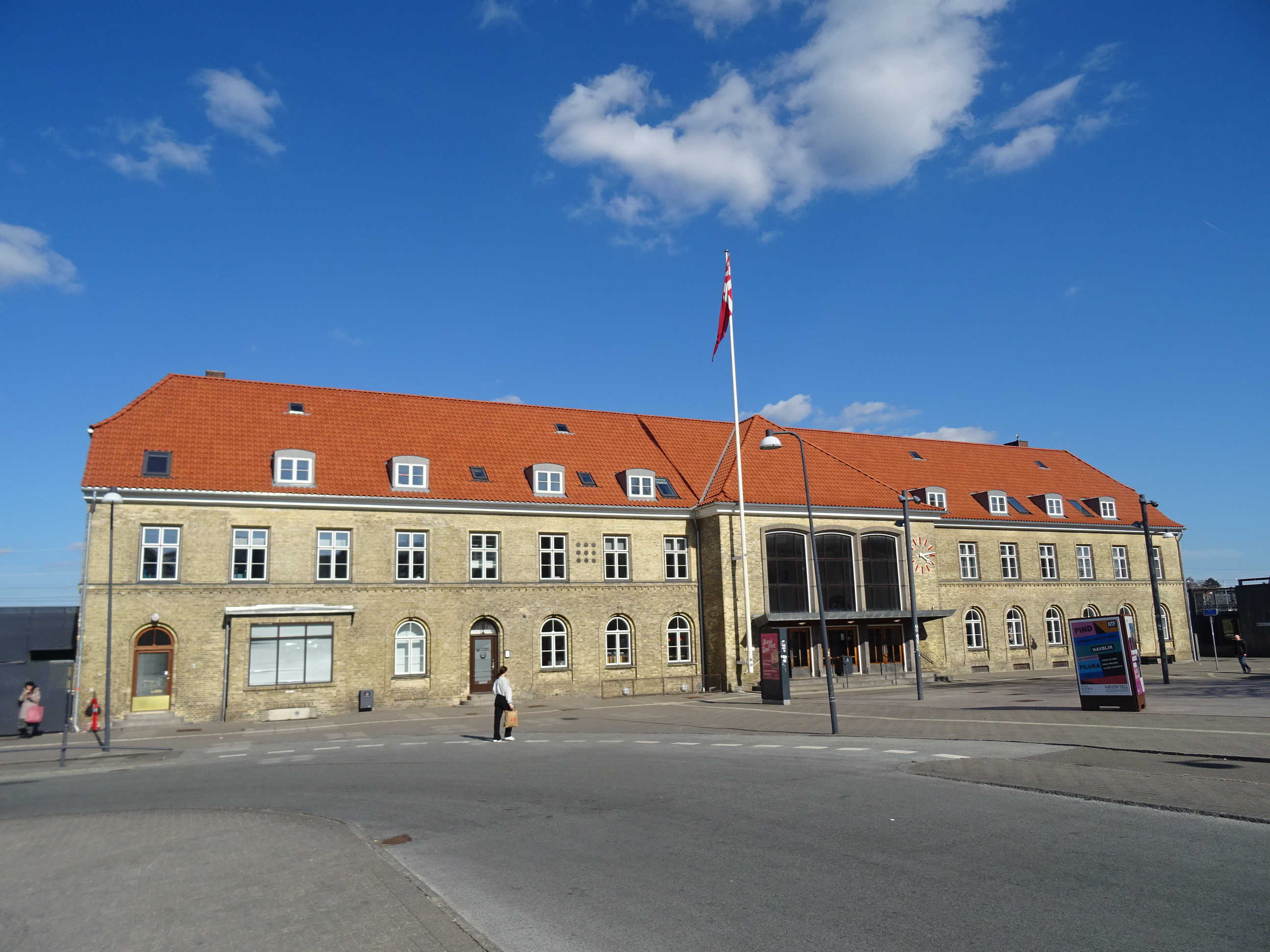
Næstved railway station

Næstved has two stations both operated by DSB, Næstved station and Næstved Nord station. Næstved station serves trains on the South Line, and is the southern terminus for trains on the Little South Line. Næstved Nord only serves the Little South Line. In April 2023, DSB started operating regional trains on the Næstved–Køge–Copenhagen route via the high speed Copenhagen–Køge Nord Line.

Heavy traffic on the motorways to Copenhagen has increased the number of commuters using rail-transport to and from the Copenhagen area.

=== Buses ===
A broad network of buses connects Næstved City to its urban area, as well as all major surrounding cities. Ticketprices are reasonable, and tickets are bought from the driver when boarding the bus. All buses depart from the bus-terminal at Næstved Station in the center of the town.

=== Roads ===
The infrastructure in Næstved has been under pressure for some years now. The roads in the city center are heavily crowded at mornings and in the afternoon. The absence of a direct motorway-connection to Copenhagen has led to numerous discussions over the years, but still, Næstveders have to take the 15-minute roadtrip to nearby Rønnede (East of the city) to access the E47/E55, connecting the area to the rest of Europe.

There are direct road connections to nearby Ringsted, Rønnede, Slagelse, Præstø and Vordingborg (80 km/h) - all four cities within 30 minutes reach.

=== Motorway Næstved - Rønnede ===
The Danish Road Directorate have made a study of a possible motorway between Næstved and Rønnede. The study shows that a motorway will cost a one billion DKK.

On 17 January 2013, the Danish Road Directorate had invited citizens, local politicians and others who were interested, to a public meeting in Toksværd near Holme Olstrup. During this meeting, it was decided that the possible motorway (Næstvedmotorvejen) should be connected near the outskirts of Rønnede, by the upcoming business area of Eco Valley, near the South Motorway (Sydmotorvejen).

At the same time, both municipalities, and politicians will work for the completion of the motorway in approximately 10 years (by 2023).

In 2014, the funds for the first leg of the construction fase of the Motorway was allocated by the Danish government. The motorway between Rønnede and Boserup expected to be completed in 2021.

== Telecommunication ==
At Næstved, there is a 220.1-metre-tall guyed mast for FM-/TV-broadcasting.

== Media ==
(This section needs improvement)

The national Danish broadcasting company DR has its department covering Region Zealand.

Næstved has numerous local media, from newspapers to daily television broadcasts. Media company "Sjællandske Medier" (Zealandic Media) has its headquarters in downtown Næstved, and runs a local as well as a regional newspaper called Ugeavisen Næstved and Sjællandkse. Sjællandske Medier also operates a local TV-station called "24Sjællandske", offering local news twenty-four-seven. Internet Radio: Radio Freja.

== Sports ==
The town of Næstved has several teams in the top divisions of various sports. Most notably in the football leagues, where the team has traditionally played a role on the domestic scene, but recently the basket team has been the town's most successful sports team.

The town has Næstved Arena and Næstved Stadion as large sport facilities. It also have a public swimming pool with a characteristic curved roof.

=== Næstved Boldklub (football) ===
Næstved BK is a football team operating as a club, founded in 1939 as a merger between Næstved Idrætsklub and Næstved Boldklub. They placed first in the Danish Division, the second best league of Denmark. The home kit is green-green-white (jersey-shorts-socks) and the away kit is red-red-white.

Results achieved by the club;

- Bronze medal winners: 1972, 1975, 1981, 1986
- Silver medal winners: 1980, 1988
- Danish Cup runners-up: 1994
- Danish champions (indoor soccer): 2003

=== Team FOG Næstved (basketball) ===
Næstved's basket team plays in the highest professional league in Denmark (Basketligaen) since 2005. The 1980s was a successful decade for the team, where it managed to play on the country's top league for some years; followed by a brief descent to the 2nd division in 1990s. Since the beginning of the new millenium, the team is back in the top division and is currently one of the dominating teams of Denmark within the last years.

They have reached the Danish Cup Final twice - in 2007 and again in 2009. Both times they played Bakken Bears from Aarhus - they lost both times though.

=== Other sport teams in Næstved ===
- Næstved Vikings - American football
- Team Python Pro - Cycling (Team Python Pro is the professional part of Næstved Bicycle Club (NBC))
- Næstved-Herlufsholm Håndbold - Handball (both men and women)
- VK Næstved - Volleyball
- Kvik Næstved - Table tennis - Competes in the best Danish table tennis league
- HG Fodbold (part of Herlufsholm Gymnastikforening) - Football

== Notable people ==
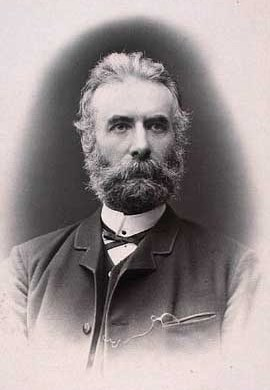
Frederik Bajer, 1911

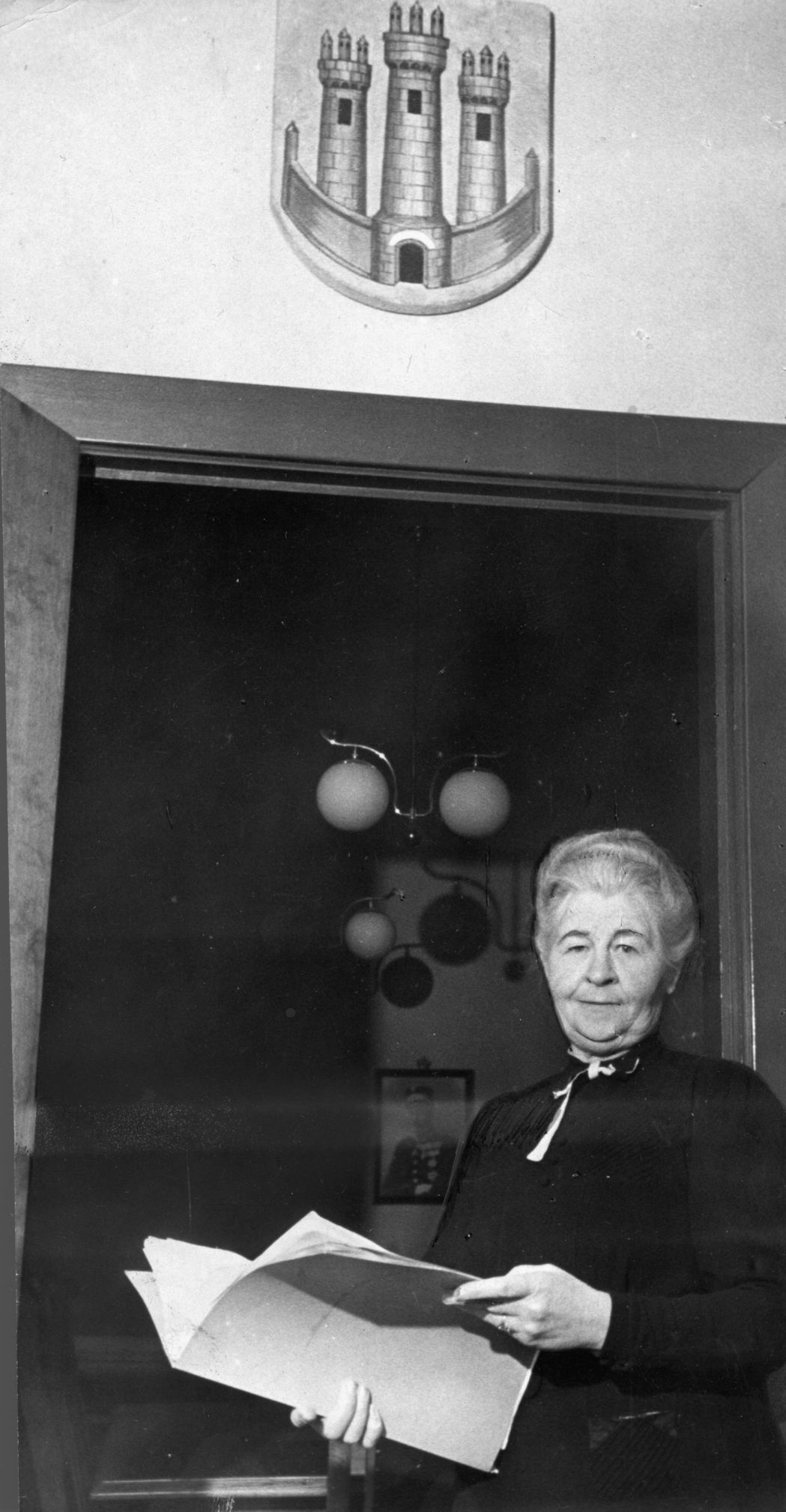
Eva Madsen, 1950

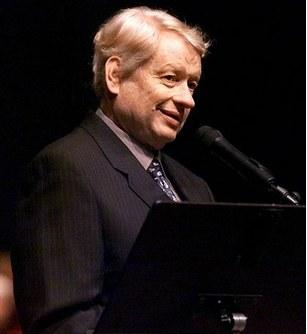
Jesper Klein, 2003

=== Society ===
- Marcus Fredrik Bang (1711–1789) a Danish-Norwegian priest, Bishop of the Diocese of Trondhjem from 1773 until 1787
- Jonas Collett (1772 at Rønnebæksholm – 1851) a Norwegian legislator, first minister of Norway (1822–1836)
- Johan Collett (1775 at Rønnebæksholm – 1827) a Norwegian politician and public administrator
- Hans Borchsenius (1832–1908) an American politician and newspaperman
- Fredrik Bajer (1837–1922) a writer, teacher, and pacifist politician, joint winner of the 1908 Nobel Peace Prize
- Joachim Wedell-Neergaard (1862–1926) a Danish diplomat, landowner and chamberlain
- Eva Madsen (1884–1972) a municipal politician, Denmark's first female mayor in 1950
- Harald T. Friis (1893–1976) a Danish-American radio engineer
- Edel Saunte (1904–1991) a jurist, social democratic politician and women's rights activist
- Gøsta Esping-Andersen (born 1947) a sociologist known for The Three Worlds of Welfare Capitalism
- Magnus Heunicke (born 1975) a Danish journalist and politician

=== Arts ===
- Hans Hansen (1769–1828) a Danish portrait painter
- Herman A. Kähler (1846–1917) a ceramic designer and manufacturer, ran Kähler Keramik
- Aage Bertelsen (1873–1945) a Danish painter, member of the Denmark Expedition to North-East Greenland and worked for Kähler Keramik in Næstved
- Thomas Wilfred (1889–1968) a musician and inventor, best known for his light art
- Jørn Larsen (1926–2004) a Danish painter and sculptor
- Jannik Hastrup (born 1941) a Danish writer, director, producer, illustrator and animator; "Denmark's grand master of animation"
- Jesper Klein (1944–2011) a Danish actor
- Jens Winther (1960–2011) a Danish jazz trumpeter, composer, arranger and bandleader
- Steen Ipsen (born 1966) an artist known for his contemporary free form ceramic work

=== Sport ===
- Hans Jacob Nielsen (1899–1967), lightweight boxer, gold medalist at the 1924 Summer Olympics
- Steen Mastrup (born 1958) is a former motorcycle speedway rider
- Michael Jensen (born 1975), racing driver
- Martin Møller (born 1980) a Danish cross-country skier from Greenland
- Morten Jørgensen (born 1985) is a lightweight rower. He was a gold medalist at the 2008 Summer Olympics as a member of the Gold Four, or Guldfireren, and has won several World and European championships.
- Mads Christiansen (born 1986) is a handballer, team gold medalist at the 2016 Summer Olympics
- Mette Poulsen (born 1993), badminton player
- Malte Amundsen (born 1998), footballer

== See also ==
- Chronicle of the Expulsion of the Grayfriars#Chapter 13 Concerning the Friary in Næstved
