= Old Town Hall (Næstved) =

Medieval town hall building in Næstved, Denmark

Coordinates: 55.2303°N 11.7575°E

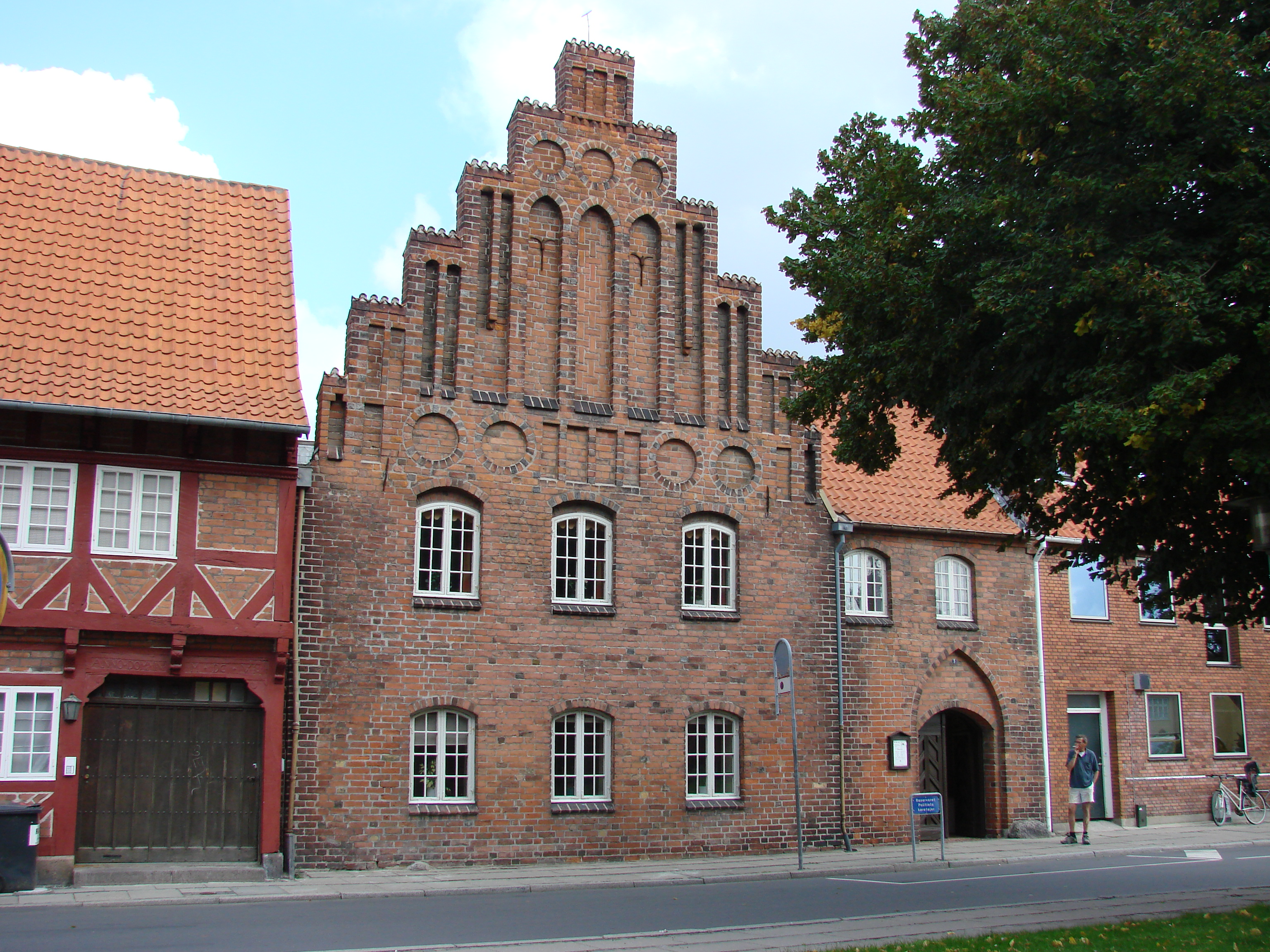
The old town hall in Næstved

The Old Town Hall in Næstved, Denmark, dates from about 1450. It was extended with an extra floor in the 16th century. It is the only Danish medieval town hall building which exists today. It is located next to St. Peter's Church.
