= St. Peter's Church, Næstved =

Coordinates: 55°14′0″N 11°46′0″E

Saint Peter's Church
- Sankt Peders Kirke
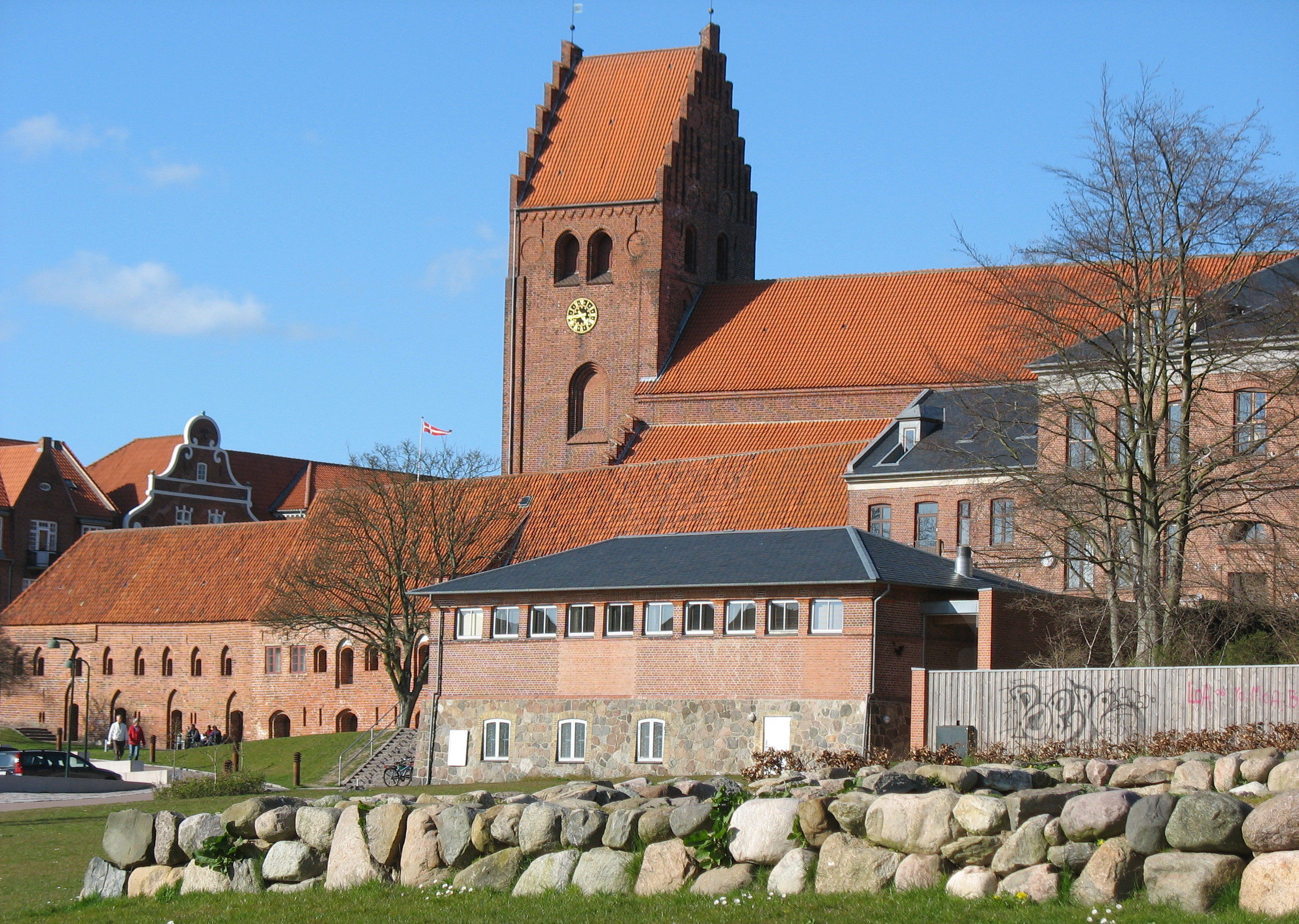
- Saint Peter's Church
- Location: Næstved, Denmark
- Denomination: Church of Denmark
- Website: sct.pederskirke.dk

Architecture
- Architectural type: Gothic
- Years built: 14th century

Administration
- Diocese: Diocese of Roskilde
- Parish: Sankt Peders Sogn (Næstved Municipality)

St. Peter's Church (Danish: Sankt Peders Kirke) is located at Næstved on the Danish island of Zealand. St. Peter's is situated in the Næstved parish of the Diocese of Roskilde of the Church of Denmark. The church is one of Denmark's foremost Gothic buildings.

== History ==
The church was first documented in a monasterial letter from 1135.

Today's Gothic church replaced an older Romanesque cross-shaped building built of limestone and brick from the second half of the 12th century. This in turn was built on the site of an even older stone church with two western towers. In 1375, the extension to the present Gothic church began. Built of red brick, it is one of Denmark's largest and finest Gothic buildings, scarcely altered since 1375. The chancel, with its five tall windows, is particularly impressive. The church has undergone several restorations, including one from 1852 to 1856 by the architects Niels Sigfred Nebelong and Georg Kretz, and again from 1883 to 1885 by the architects Johan Daniel Herholdt and Vilhelm Ahlmann. It is Næstved's largest church, measuring 55 m in length.

== Furnishings ==
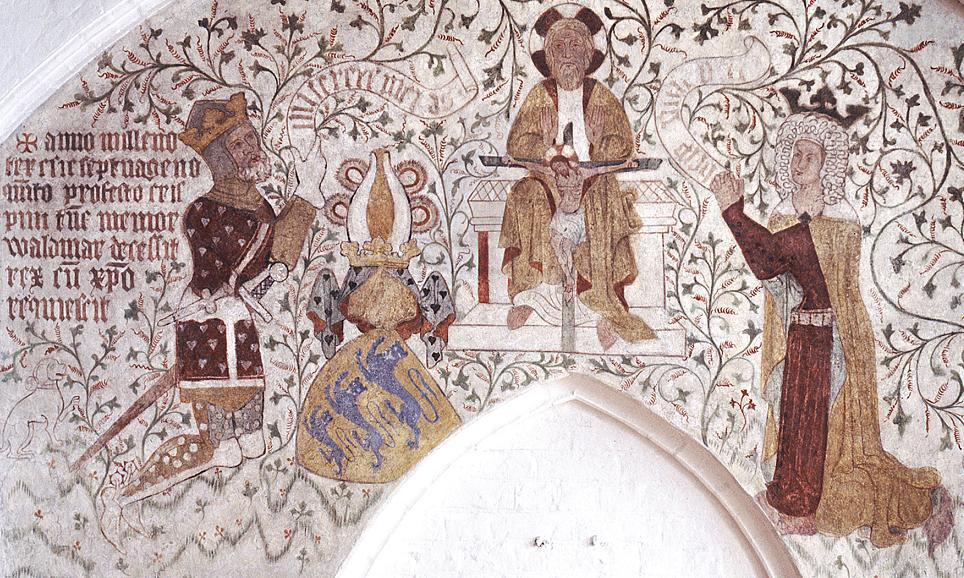
Fresco of King Valdemar IV and Queen Helvig

The church's most notable fresco is on the north wall of the chancel. It depicts King Valdemar IV and Queen Helvig. There are several uncovered frescoes in the church by lime painter Morten Maler whose frescoes also appear at Gerlev Church (Gerlev kirke) and Gimlinge Church (Gimlinge Kirke) in Slagelse.

The most imposing feature of the church is the pulpit, designed by Lorentz Jørgensen of Holbæk in 1671. Two rows of choir stalls and a bronze font date back to about 1500.

The altarpiece is headed by a late-Gothic arched crucifix which the church received in 1844 from nearby Fodby Church (Fodby kirke). The tower clock dates to 1736 and is the work of J.D. Galle of Næstved. The church also contains a number of gravestones and epitaphs dedicated to the families of Næstved.

The church organ is from 1960 and built by Marcussen & Son.

== Burials ==
Notable burials in the church:

- Axel Arenfeldt (1590–1647), government official and landowner
- Otte Brahe (1579–1651), landowner
- Caspar Paslick (1530–1597), diplomat
- Abel Schrøder (c. 1602–1676)m woodcarver and organist
- Peter West (1708–1878), military officer and landowner

== See also ==
- Old Town Hall (Næstved)
- Architecture of Denmark
